= Umm Haram =

Companion (Sahabiyyah) of Muhammad

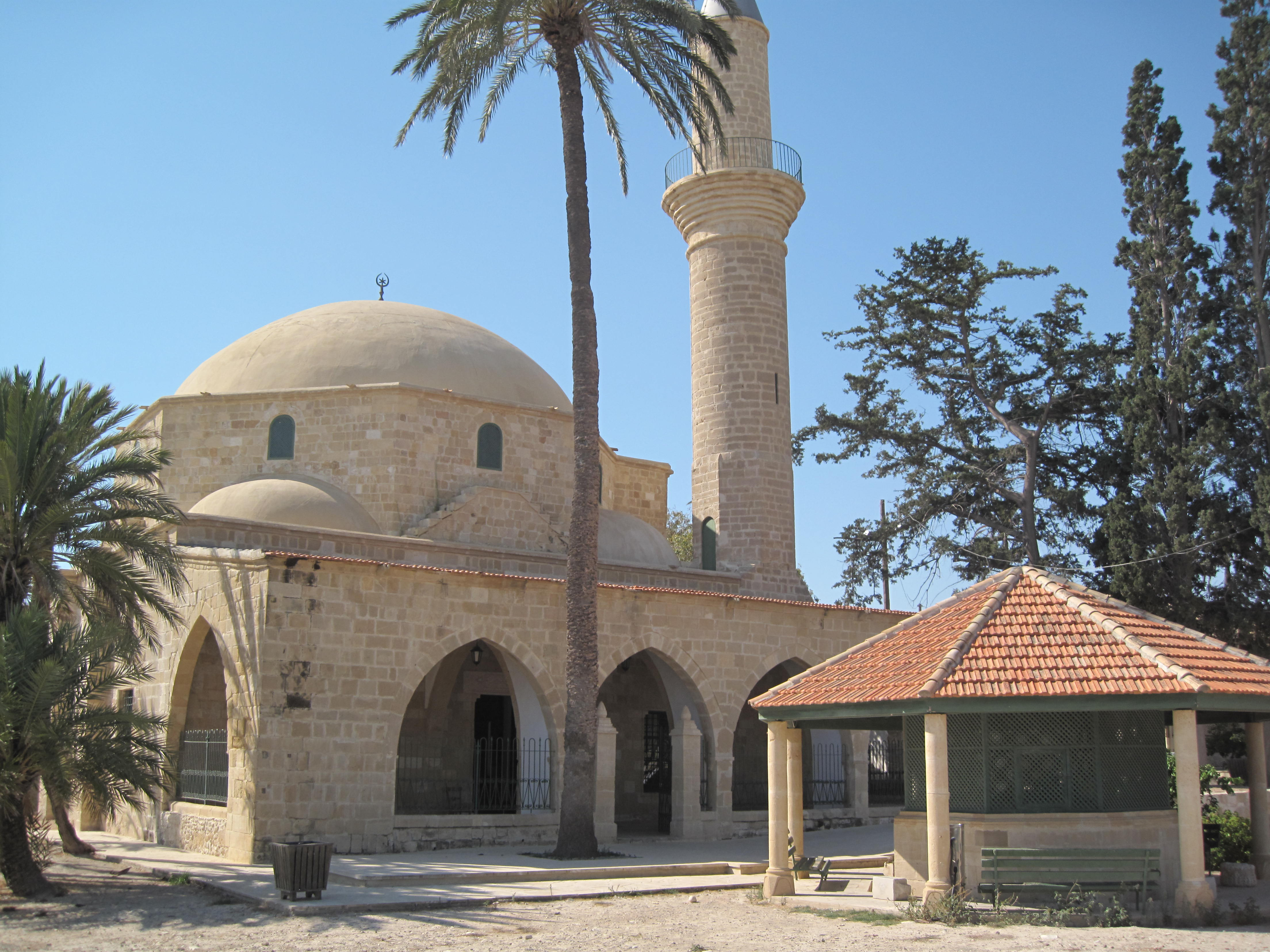
- Hala Sultan Tekke in Larnaca, Cyprus
- Born: Medina, Arabia
- Died: c. 648; Larnaca, Cyprus, Byzantine Empire
- Spouse: Ubada ibn al-Samit
- Relatives: Banu Najjar (clan)
- Military career
- Allegiance: Rashidun Caliphate
- Branch: Caliphal army
- Service years: 625–648
- Conflicts: Campaigns of Muhammad; Battle of Uhud (625); Battle of Hunayn (630); Early Muslim conquests; Muslim conquest of Cyprus (648)

Umm Haram bint Milhan (Arabic: أم حرام بنت ملحان, romanized: ʾUmm Ḥarām bint Milḥān; died 648), known as Hala Sultan in Turkish tradition, was a follower or companion (Sahabiyyah) of the Islamic prophet Muhammad صلى الله عليه وسلم as well as his distant aunt. She was also the maternal aunt of Anas ibn Malik, and one of the Ansar women of Medina.

== Biography ==
Umm Haram belonged to Najjar clan from Banu Khazraj of the Ansar. She was the sister of Umm Sulaym and their house was often visited by Muhammad. Her brothers, Haram bin Milhan and Sulaym bin Milhan participated in the Battle of Badr and Uhud. She was married to 'Ubadah ibn al-Samit, a companion of Muhammad. 'Ubadah was one of the first Ansari men to take part in the Pledge of al-Aqabah. She was also aunt of Anas bin Malik, Muhammad's servant. She was one of the Muslim wartime nurses who served wounded soldiers during the battles of Uhud and Hunayn. During the Cyprus expedition, she sailed on the sea under Mu'awiya in the caliphate of Uthman (r. 644–656). She fell down from her riding animal and died.

The tomb of Umm Haram is in Larnaca, Cyprus and a mosque is built beside it. The mosque is known as Hala Sultan Tekke.
