= Haram bin Milhan =

Muhammad's Companion

Haram bin Milhan (Arabic: حرام بن ملحان; died 625) was a companion of the Islamic prophet Muhammad. He was one of the Ansari people from Medina.

Being a member of Najjar clan from Banu Khazraj, he was brother of Umm Haram and Umm Sulaym (the mother of Anas bin Malik). During the Expedition of Bir Maona, Muslims sent him as a messenger with a letter of Muhammad to Amir ibn al-Tufayl, the nephew of Abu Bara and the chief of Banu Amir. Banu Amir did not read the message but ordered a man to spear Haram bin Milhan in the back. His uncle was also stabbed during the Expedition of Bir Maona.

== See also ==
- List of battles of Muhammad
