= Eyüp Sultan Mosque =

Mosque in Eyüp, Istanbul, Turkey

- Eyüp Sultan Camii
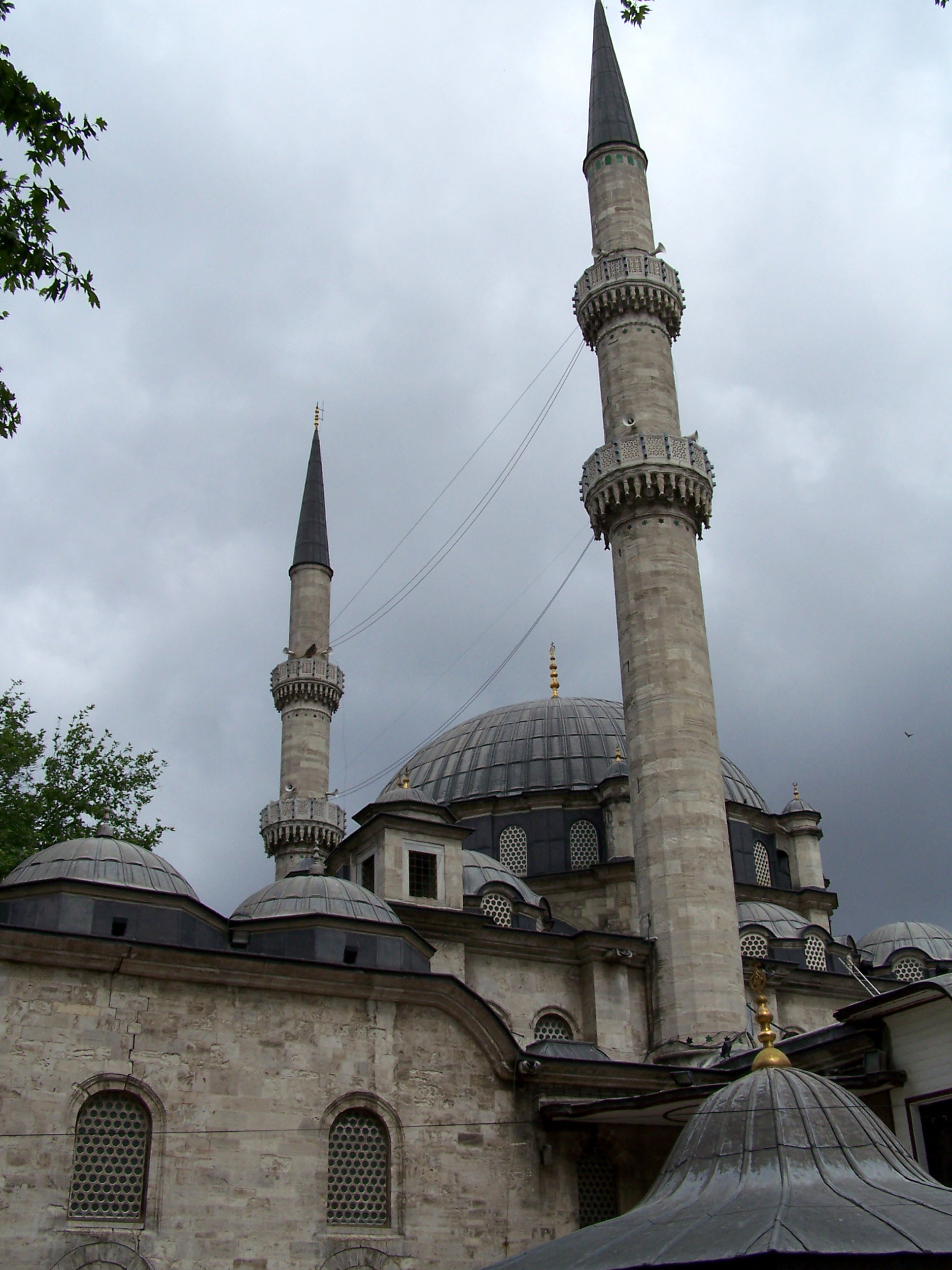

- Location within Istanbul

Religion
- Affiliation: Sunni Islam
- Sect: Hanafi
- Ecclesiastical or organisational status: Mosque
- Status: Active

Location
- Location: Istanbul
- Country: Turkey
- Coordinates: 41°02′52.61″N 28°56′01.63″E

Architecture
- Type: Mosque
- Style: Ottoman Baroque, Tulip Period style, Classical Ottoman
- Completed: 1458, rebuilt 1800
- Minaret: 2

The Eyüp Sultan Mosque (Turkish: Eyüp Sultan Camii) is a mosque in Eyüp district of Istanbul, Turkey. The mosque complex includes a mausoleum marking the spot where Ebu Eyüp el-Ansari (Abu Ayyub al-Ansari), the standard-bearer and companion of the prophet Muhammad, is said to have been buried. On a much older site, the present building dates from the beginning of the 19th century.

Because of its particular sanctity, the mosque played a role in the coronation ceremony for new Ottoman Sultans, who came here — proceeding along the grand Cülus Yolu ('Accession Way') — to be girded with the Sword of Osman at the start of their reigns. Today it remains a popular pilgrimage destination.

== History ==
The mosque is named after Abu Ayyub al-Ansari (Eyüp Sultan in Turkish), a companion and trusted friend of Muhammad, who is believed to have died here during the first Arab siege of Constantinople in the 670s.

A mosque complex (külliye) was constructed on the site in 1458 by the Ottoman sultan Mehmed II only five years after the conquest of Constantinople in 1453. Mehmed II was reportedly motivated to build the mosque after his teacher, Akşemseddin, had a dream about building a commemorative mosque at the burial place of al-Ayyub al-Ansari. When al-Ansari's tomb was found in 1458 the mosque was built next to it.

In the early 18th century, Sultan Ahmed III rebuilt the two minarets of the mosque in their current form. By the end of the 18th century the mosque was in a ruinous state, perhaps as a result of earthquake damage, and in 1798 sultan Selim III ordered the whole structure other than the minarets to be pulled down and rebuilt. This work was completed in 1800. The eastern minaret was rebuilt in the original style by Mahmud II in 1822.

== Religious significance ==
As a companion of Muhammad, Abu Ayyub al-Ansari is greatly venerated by Muslims and the site of his türbe (tomb) is of particular importance. The mausoleum is positioned on the north side of a courtyard opposite the main entrance to the prayer hall of the mosque. The mosque is also important for Muslims because it holds relics believed to have belonged Muhammad.

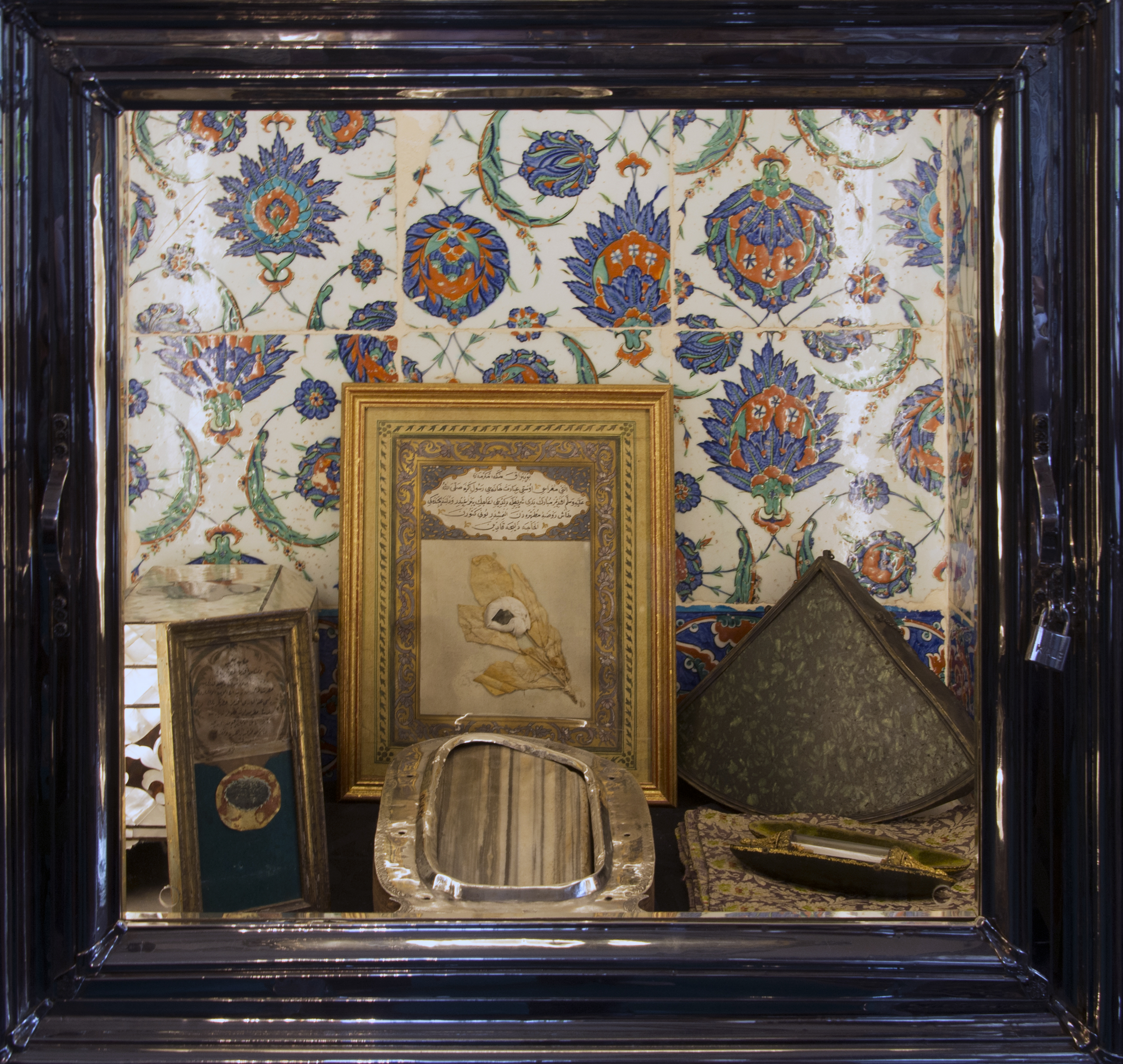
Some of the religious relics on display inside the mausoleum's vestibule

Because of the extreme holiness attached to the mosque, many important Ottoman officials and royal family members chose to be buried nearby. They include Sokollu Mehmet Paşa, an Ottoman vizier, or chief minister, who served under sultans Süleyman the Magnificent and Selim II. Also buried here are Siyavuş Paşa, another 16th-century grand vizier, and Lala Mustafa Paşa who conquered Cyprus for the Ottomans in the 16th century. Their tombs stand close to the mosque, as do those of Adile Sultan and Mihrişah Valide Sultan, royal women who were buried in grand complexes along the Cülus Yolu (Accession Road). A little more out on a limb, overlooking the water is the tomb of Sultan Mehmed V which was designed by Mimar Kemaleddin Bey in 1918. Behind the mosque Eyüp Cemetery winds up the hill to a lookout point overlooking the Golden Horn. It is crammed full of the gravestones of those who wanted to be buried close to the mosque.

In modern times the holiness of the mosque means that boys who are about to undergo circumcision (sünnet) are sometimes brought here in their special finery. Mass circumcision sessions are organised here for boys from poorer homes (these resumed in 2022 after a break caused by Covid-19 precautions). During Ramadan this is also a popular place for people to break their fast at iftar, with many choosing to picnic in the courtyard of the mosque. Throughout the year Eyüp Sultan is also a destination of pilgrimage (ziyaret) for people visiting from all over the country.

== Architecture ==
=== Mosque ===
Despite the relatively late date of its reconstruction, the Eyüp Sultan Mosque is still faithful to the Classical style of Ottoman architecture popularised by Mimar Sinan in the 16th century. In particular it has been compared to Sinan's Sokollu Mehmed Pasha Mosque in the Azapkapı neighbourhood, as it follows the same "octagonal baldaquin" design with a central dome surrounded by semi-domes. (Note: The term "octagonal baldaquin" refers to the fact that the weight of the main dome is supported by eight principal pillars arranged in an octagonal formation.) Much of its decoration, however, is in the contemporary Ottoman Baroque style, with engaged columns, carved foliate and shell shapes, and Ottoman calligraphic inscriptions. The columns have simple, Ionic-like capitals. The undulating decoration of the gateways, mihrab and minbar are among the finest examples of this style from the Ottoman Baroque period. The building is primarily built in white stone, with some columns in white marble bound with brass, and some of the decoration gilded. The mosque has two minarets built in an earlier style.

Interior of the mosque

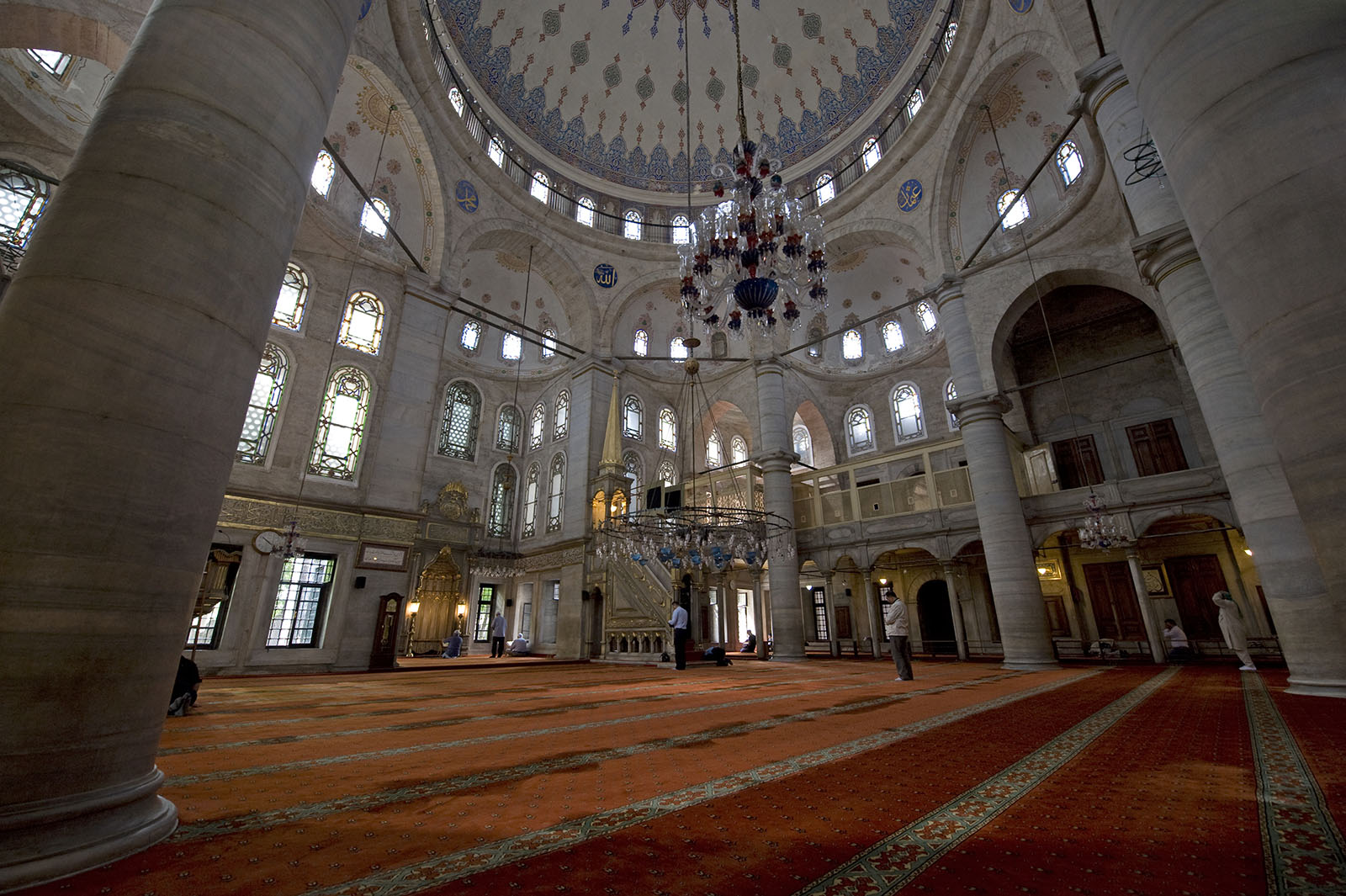
Mosque interior (prayer hall)

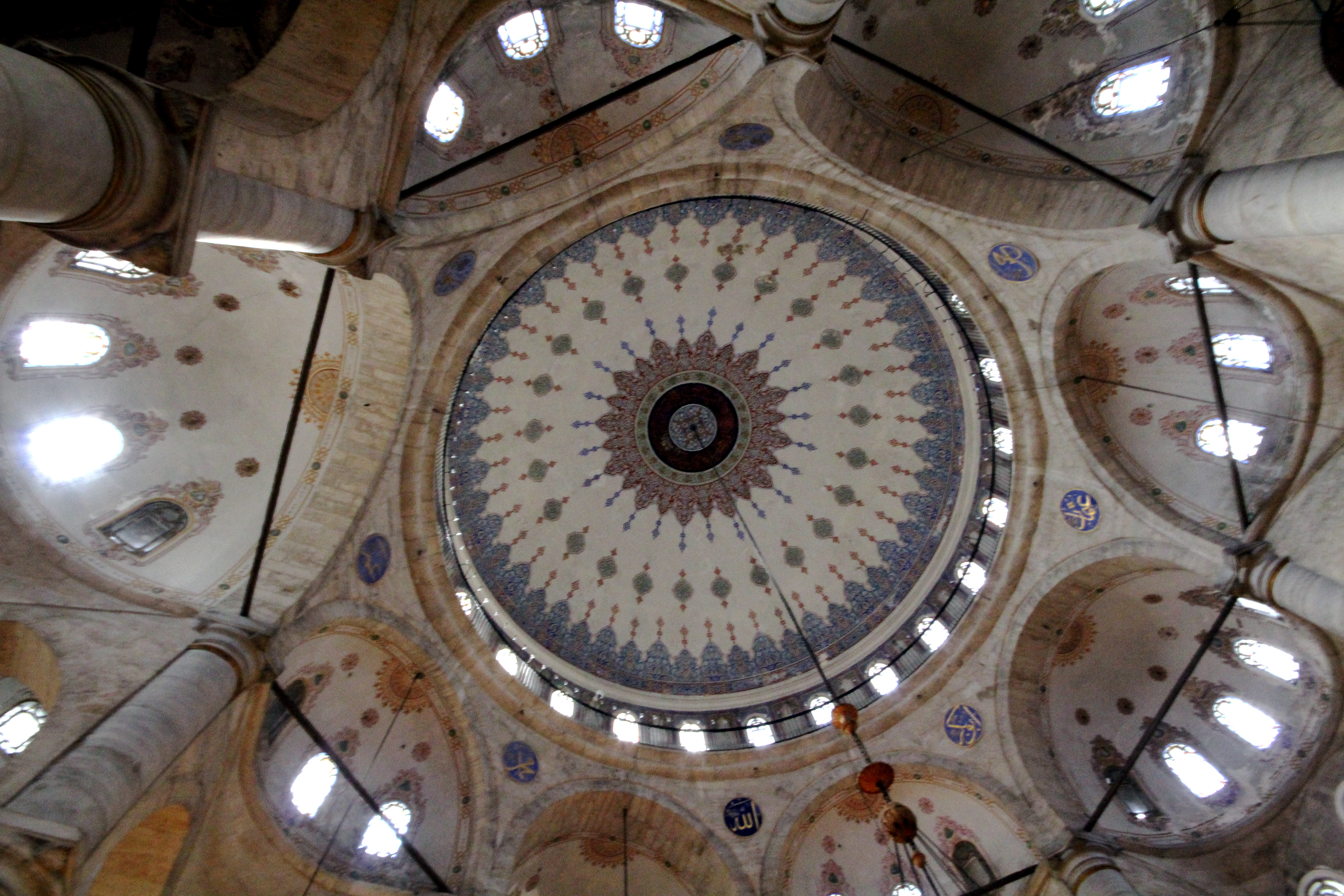
Interior of the mosque dome, flanked by semi-domes

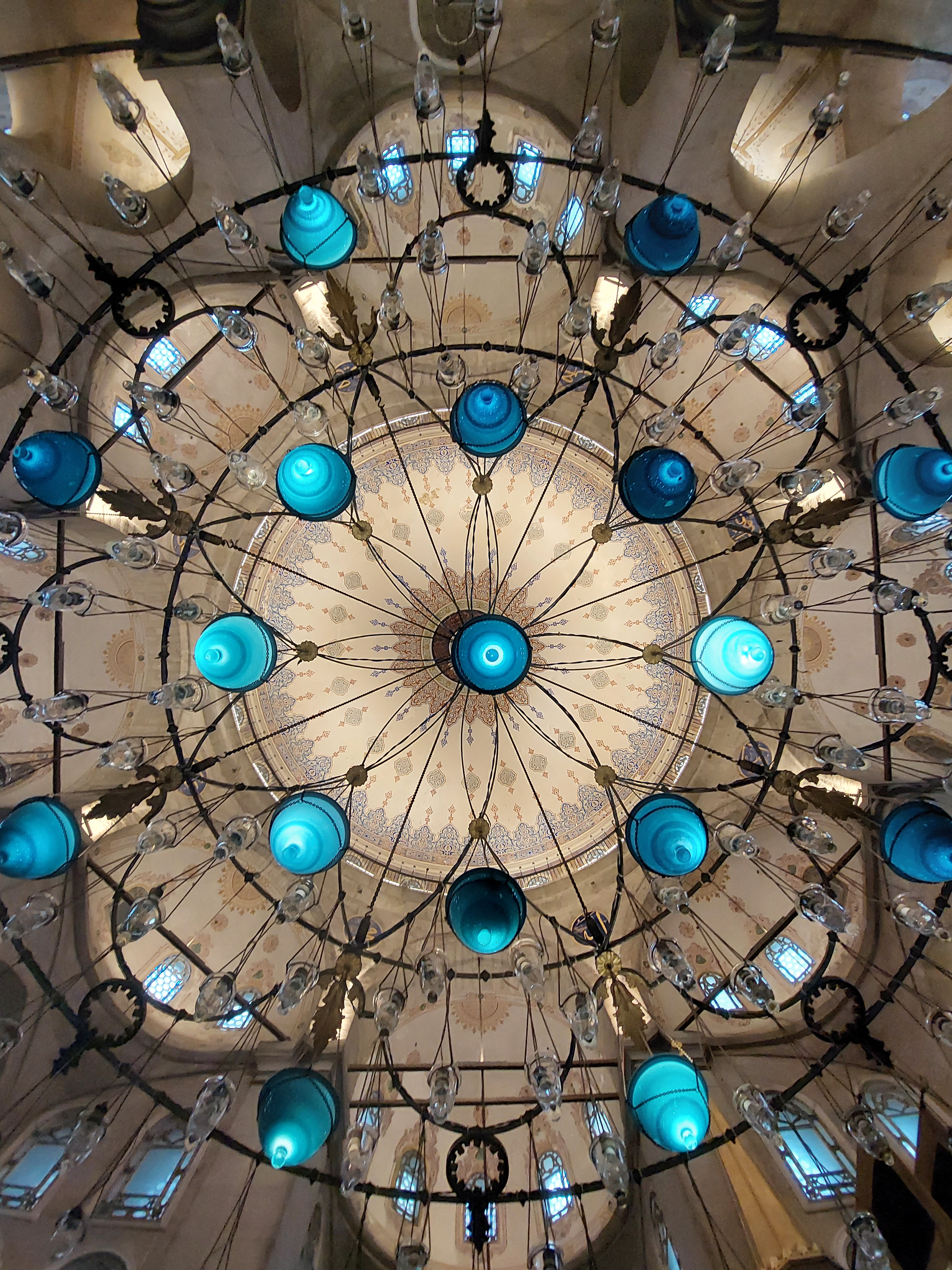
Dome seen directly from below (through the central chandelier)

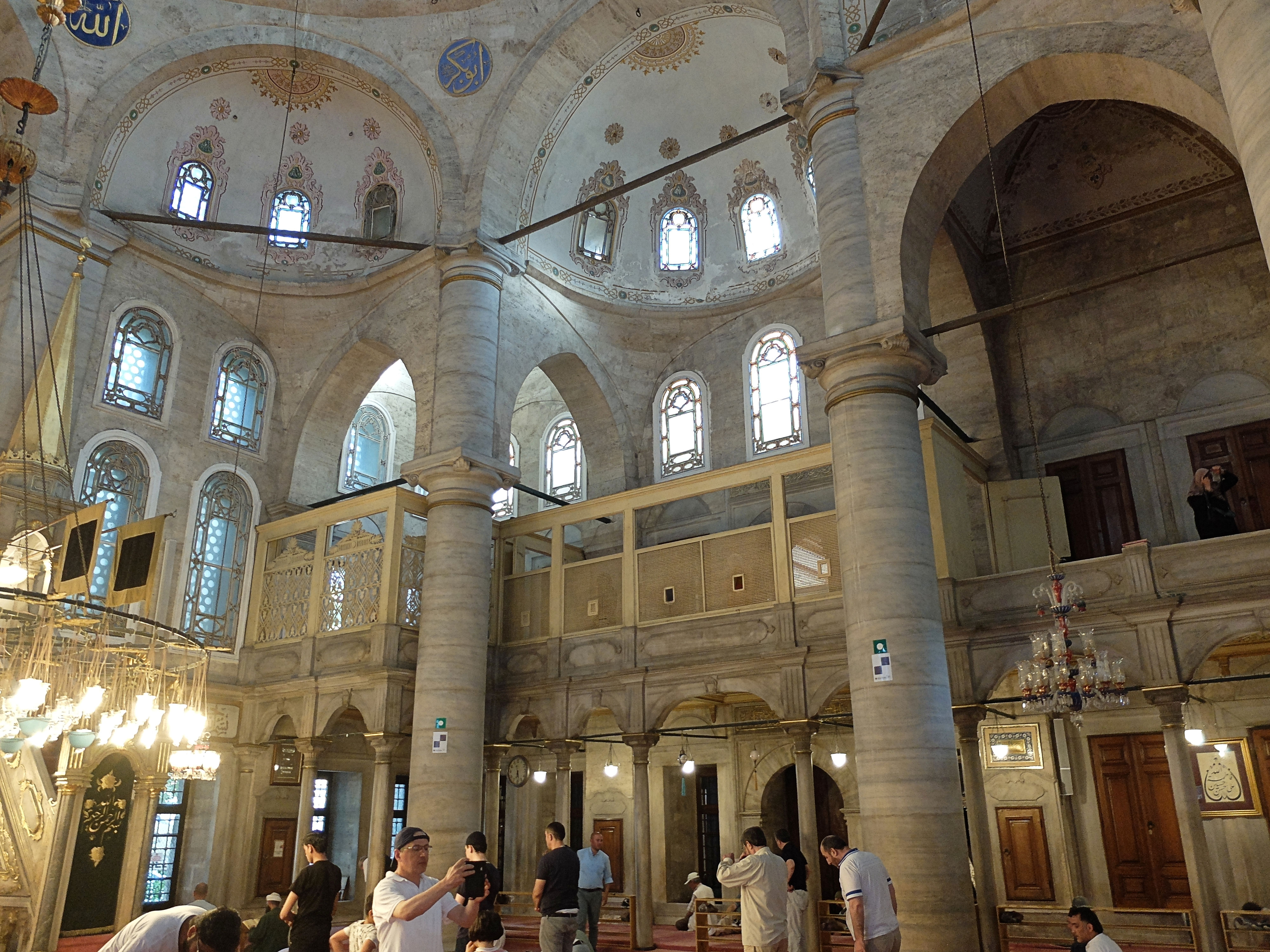
The sultan's private balcony or loge, in the corner of the prayer hall

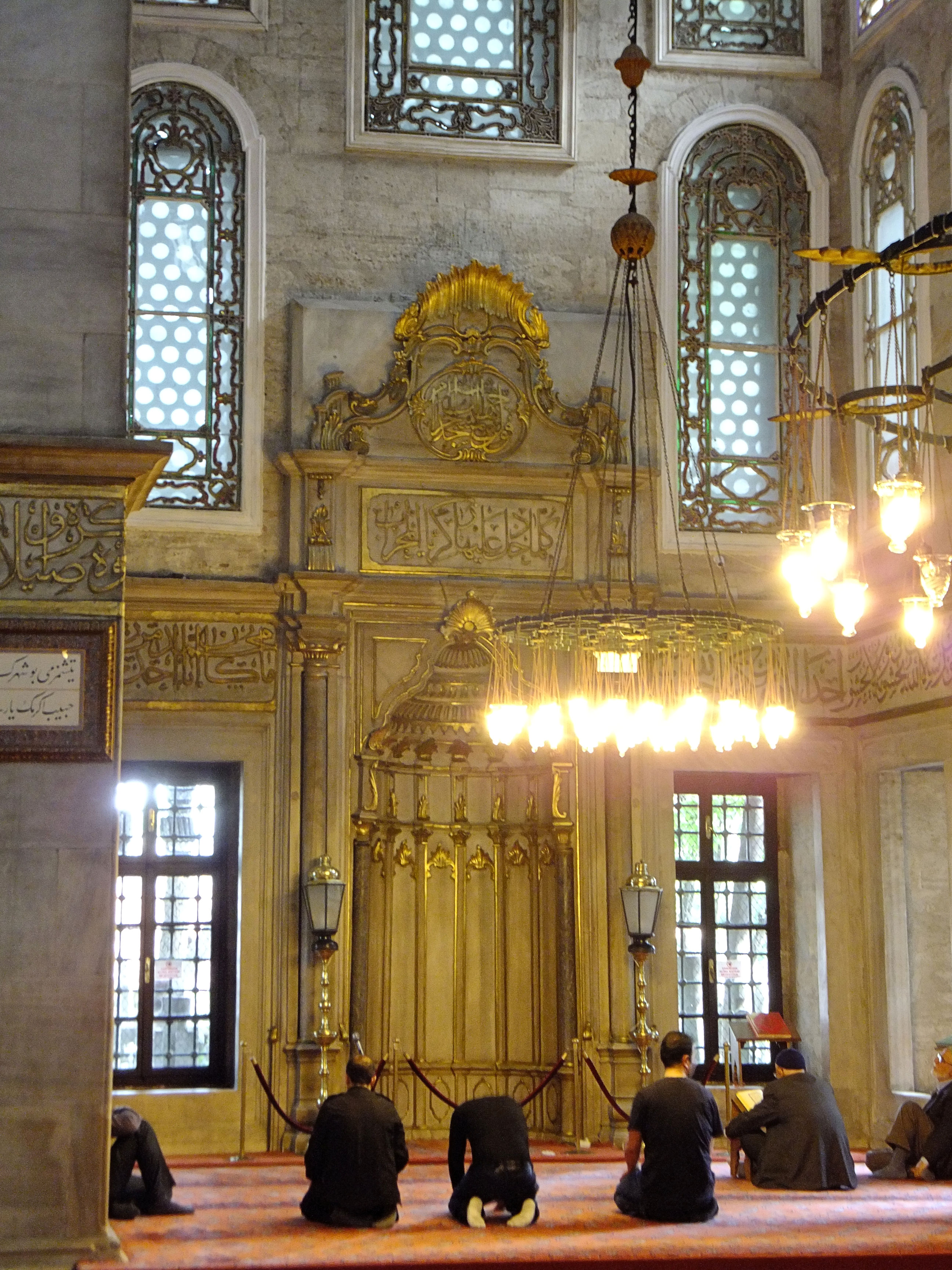
Mihrab of the mosque

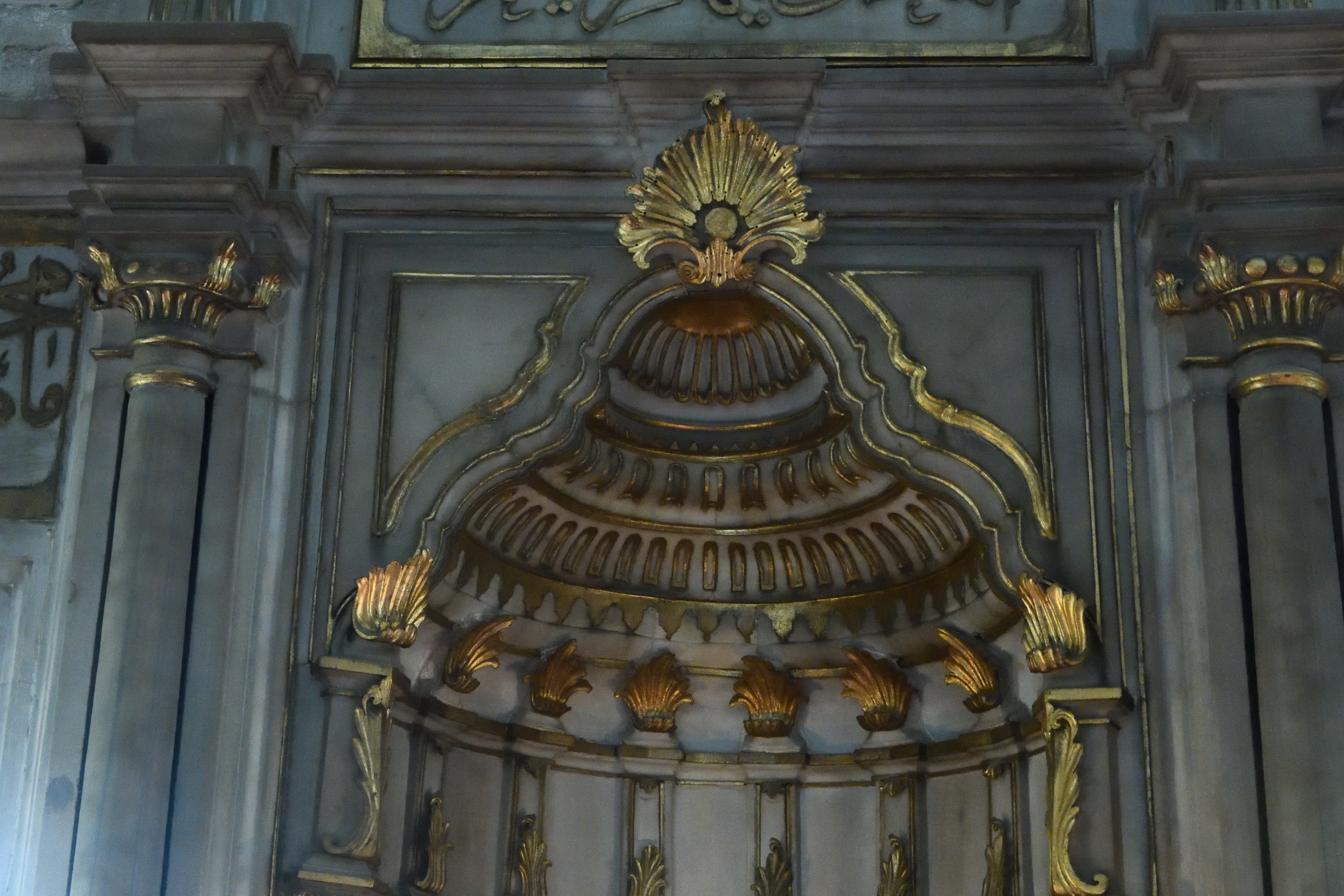
Detail of the mihrab

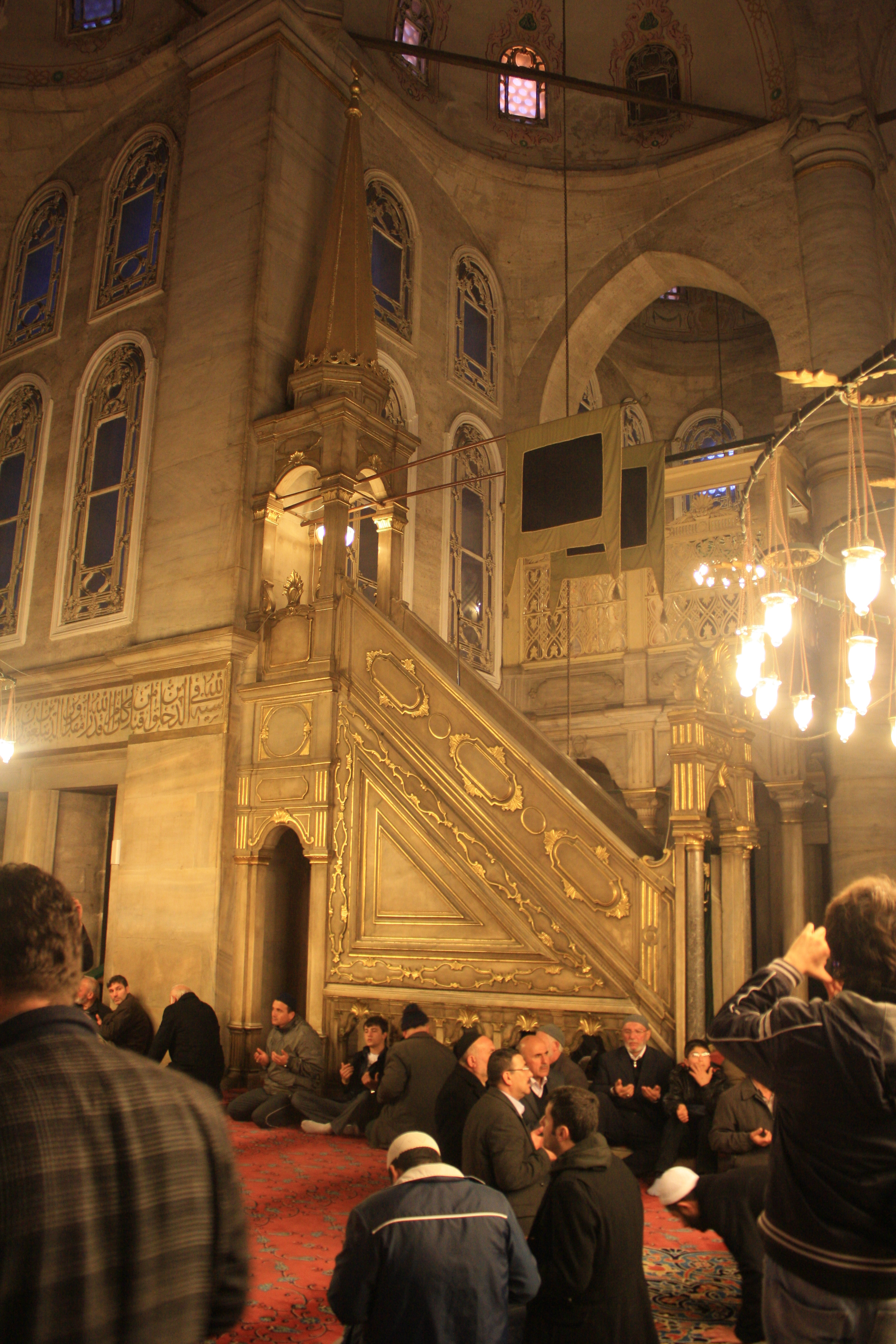
Minbar (pulpit) of the mosque

From the outside, a large outer courtyard of irregular shape leads to an inner rectangular courtyard. An elevated, enclosed corridor running along the south side of the outer courtyard was originally the sultan's private entrance to the mosque and to his loge (private screened balcony) inside the prayer hall. The şadırvan (ablutions fountain) is located in this courtyard. The inner courtyard grants access to the mosque on one side and to the shrine of Abu Ayyub al-Ansari on the other. An old plane tree stands in the middle of this courtyard on a rectangular platform or parterre with Baroque marble fountains at its corners. This platform was formerly where Ottoman sultans were girded with the Sword of Osman upon their accession to the throne. A portico of arches and domes runs around three sides of the courtyard, preceding the entrance to the mosque.

Exterior of mosque and courtyards

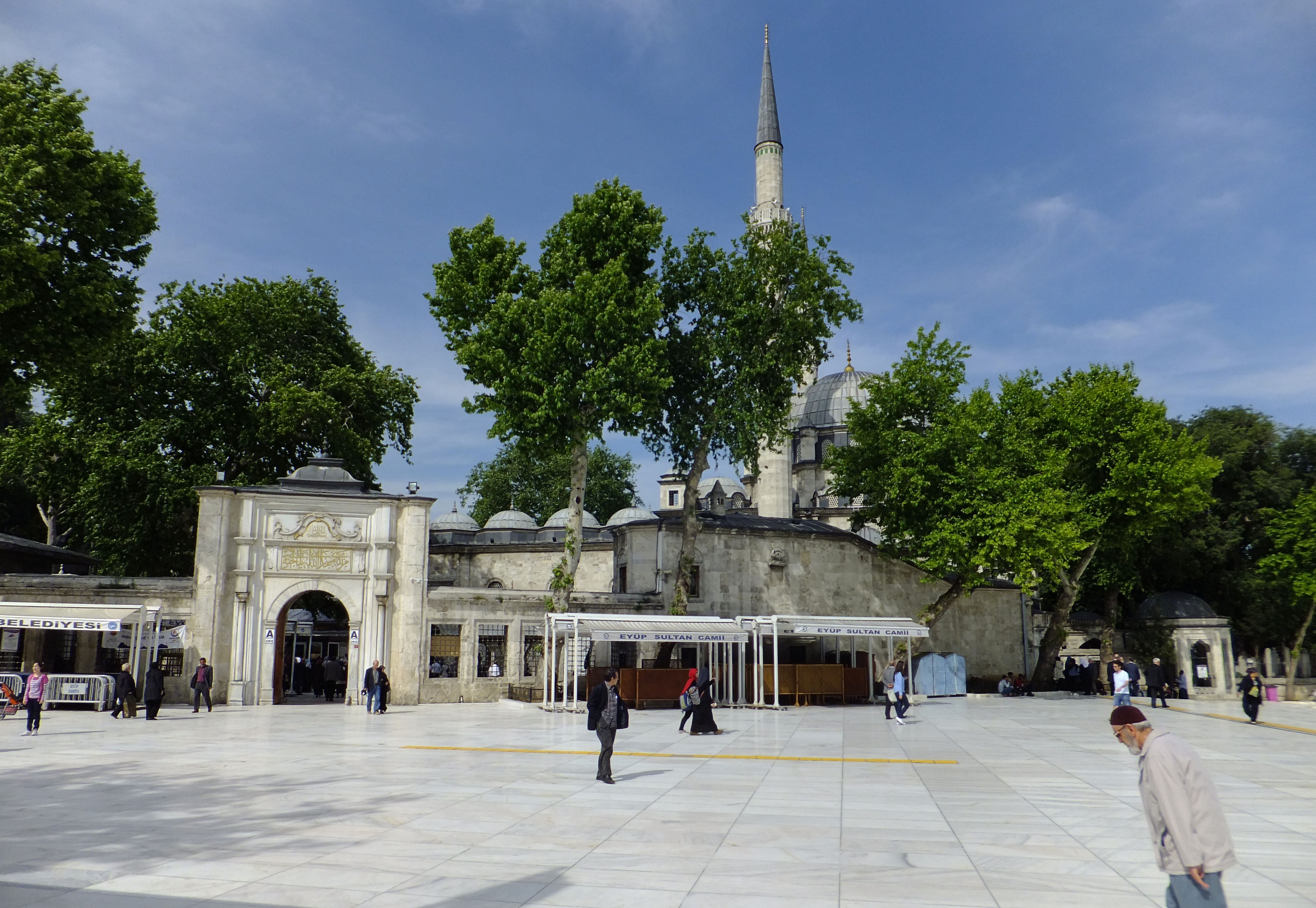
Exterior view of the complex, from the west

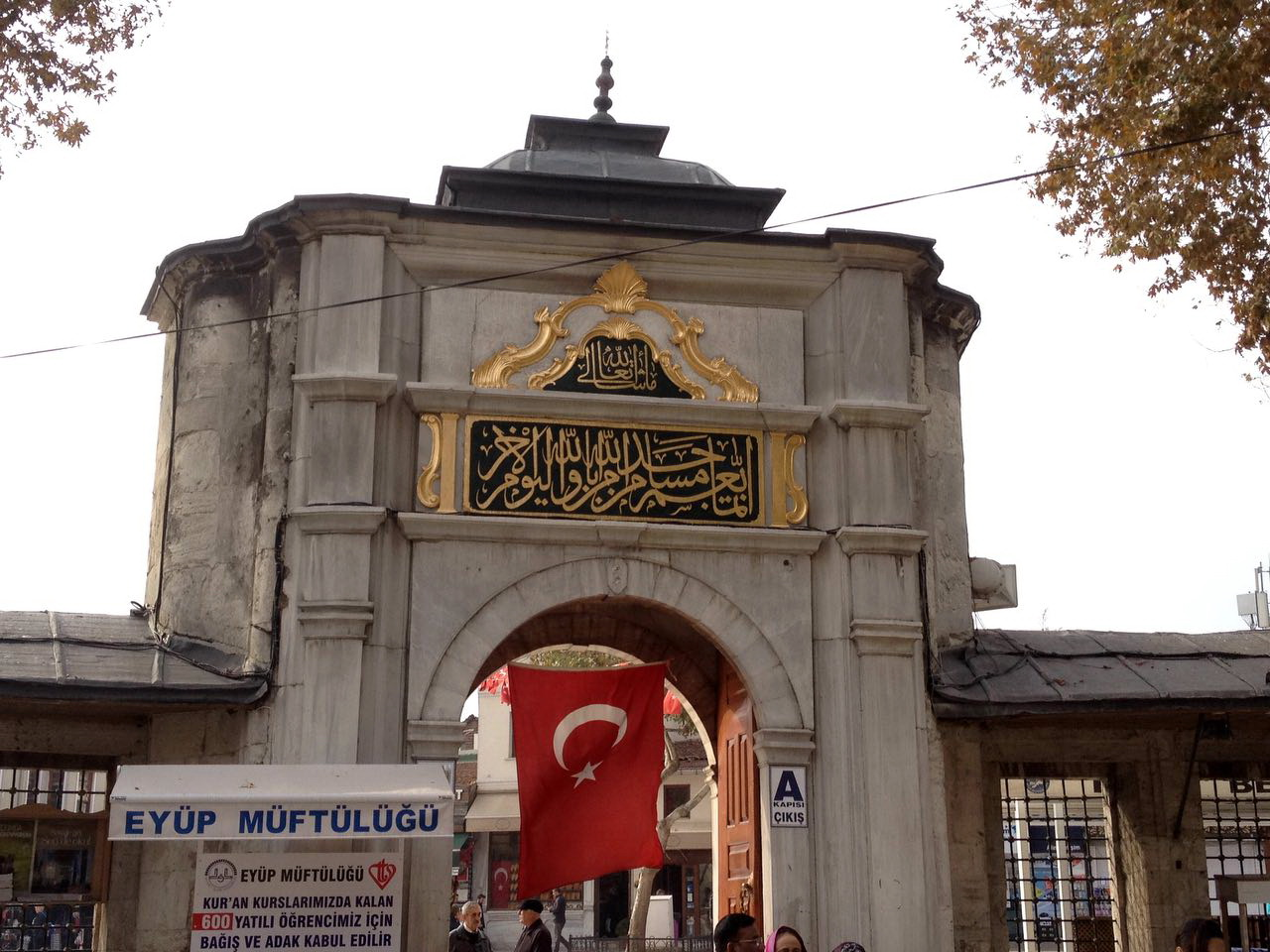
Gate of the outer courtyard (Note: The Quranic verse in Arabic reads: "The mosques of Allah shall be visited and maintained by such as believe in Allah and the Last Day." (Arabic: إِنَّمَا يَعْمُرُ مَسَاجِدَ اللَّهِ مَنْ آمَنَ بِاللَّهِ وَالْيَوْمِ الْآخِرِ))

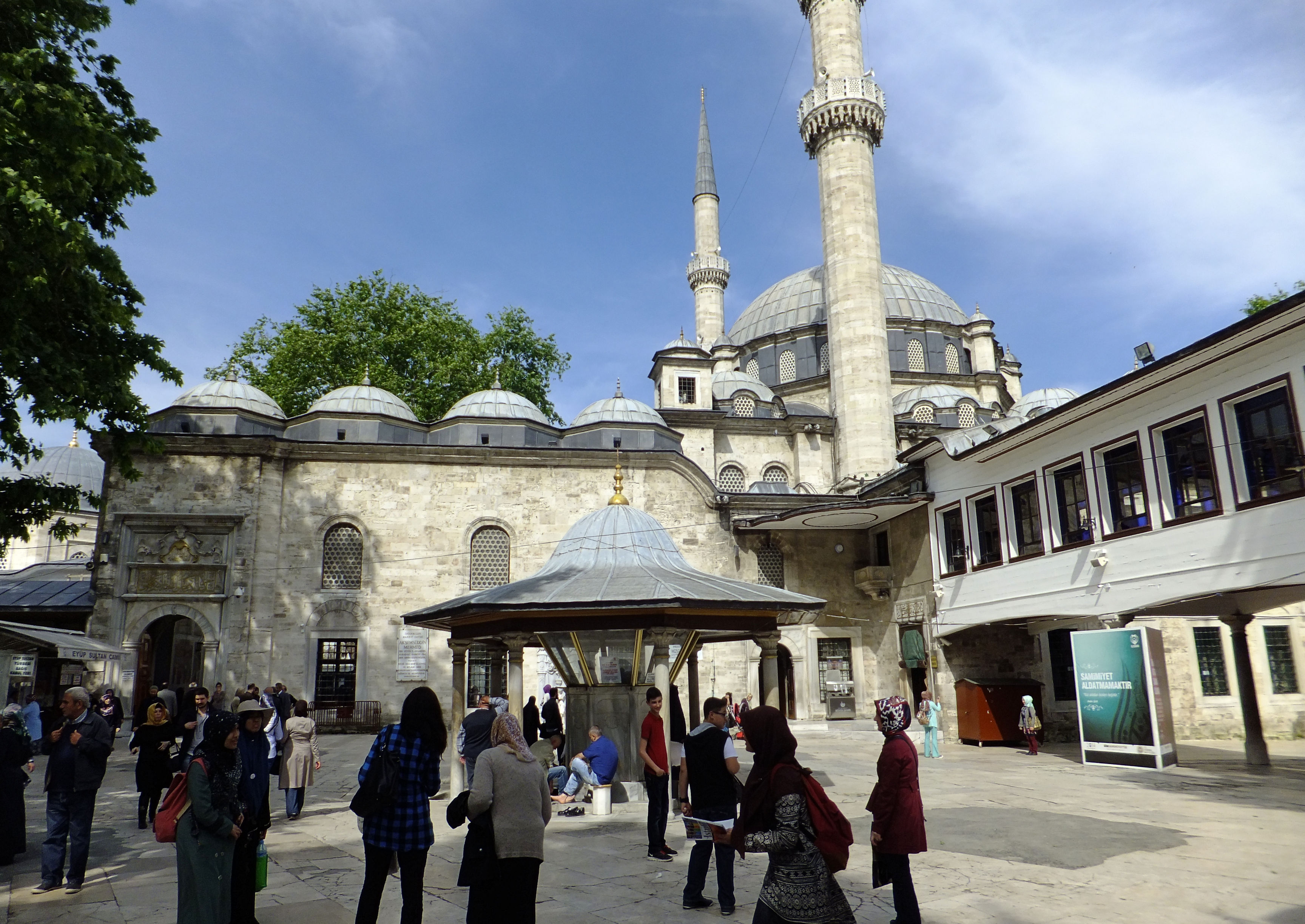
Outer courtyard of the mosque

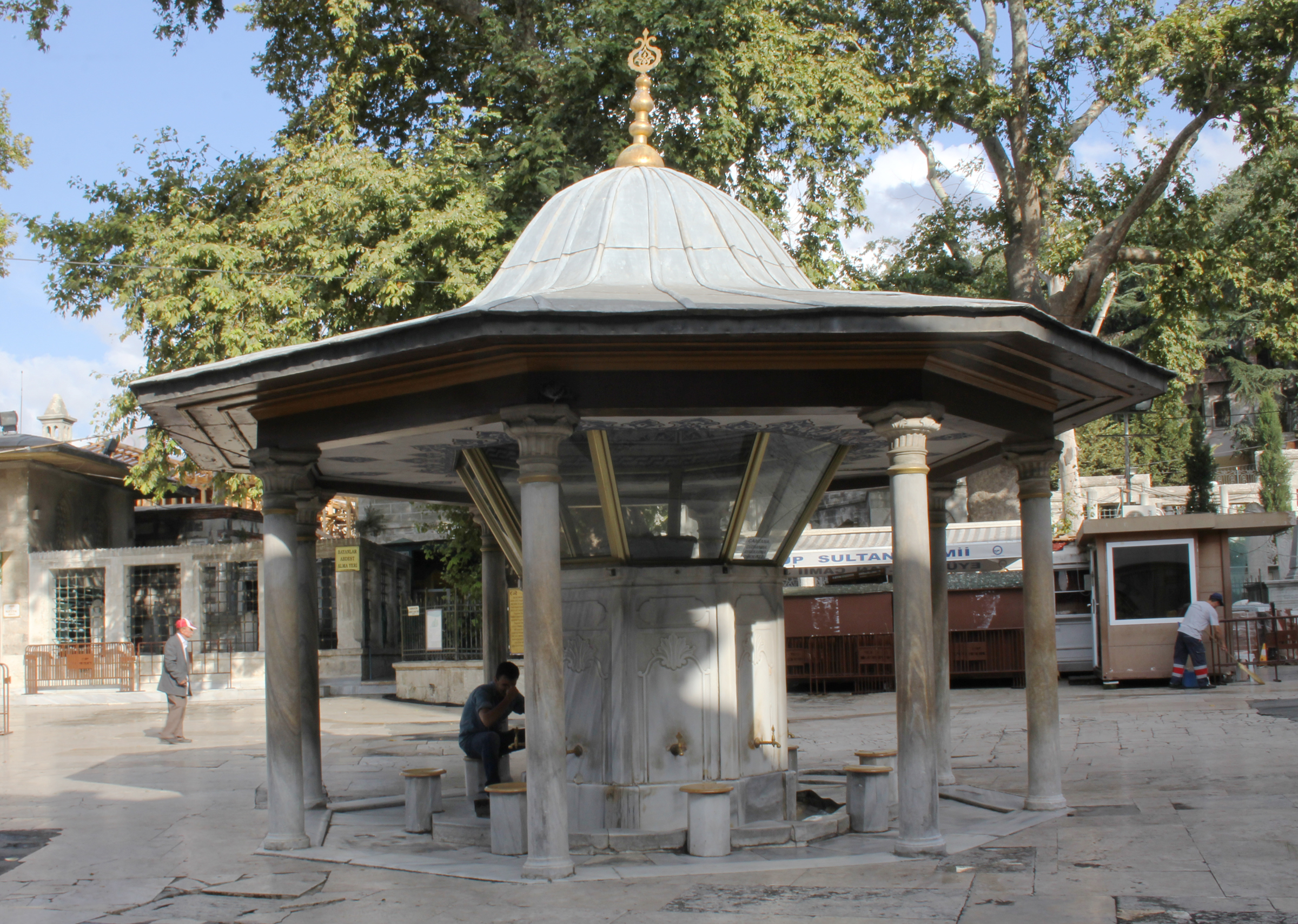
Ablutions fountain (şadırvan) in the outer courtyard

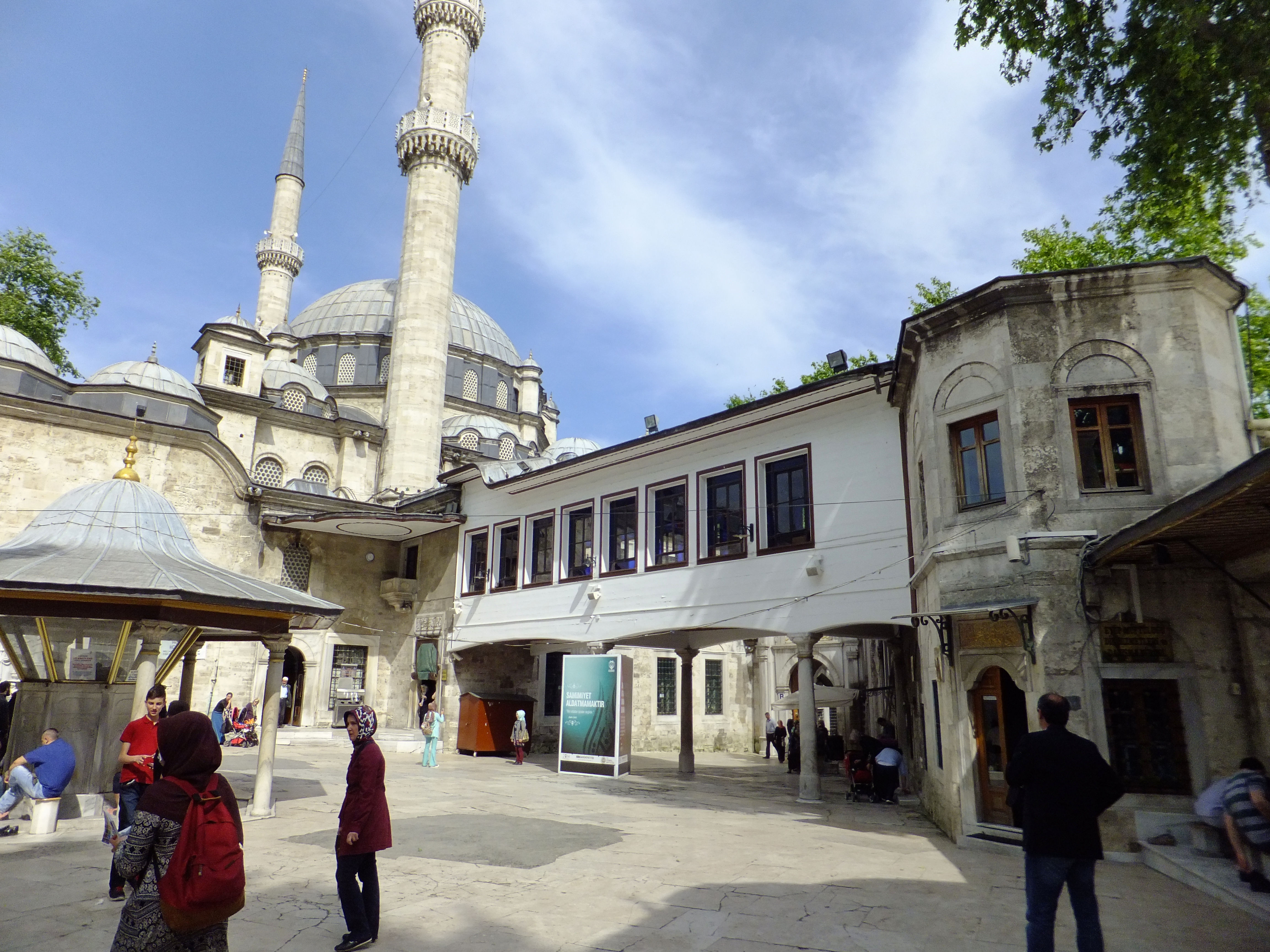
View of the elevated passage formerly used as the sultan's entrance to the mosque

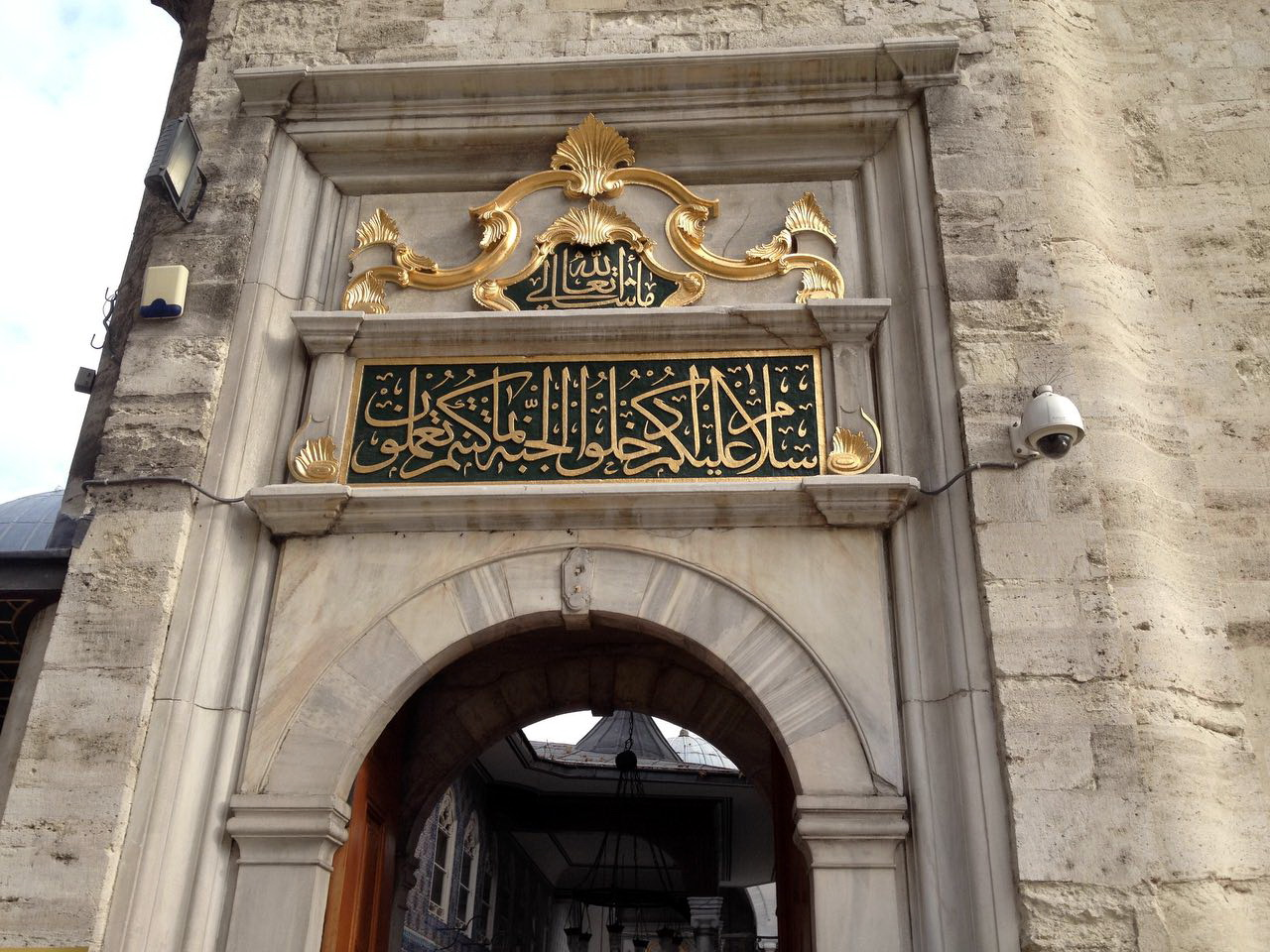
Gate to the inner courtyard (Note: The Quranic verse in Arabic reads: "Peace be upon you! Enter Paradise for what you used to do" (16:32))

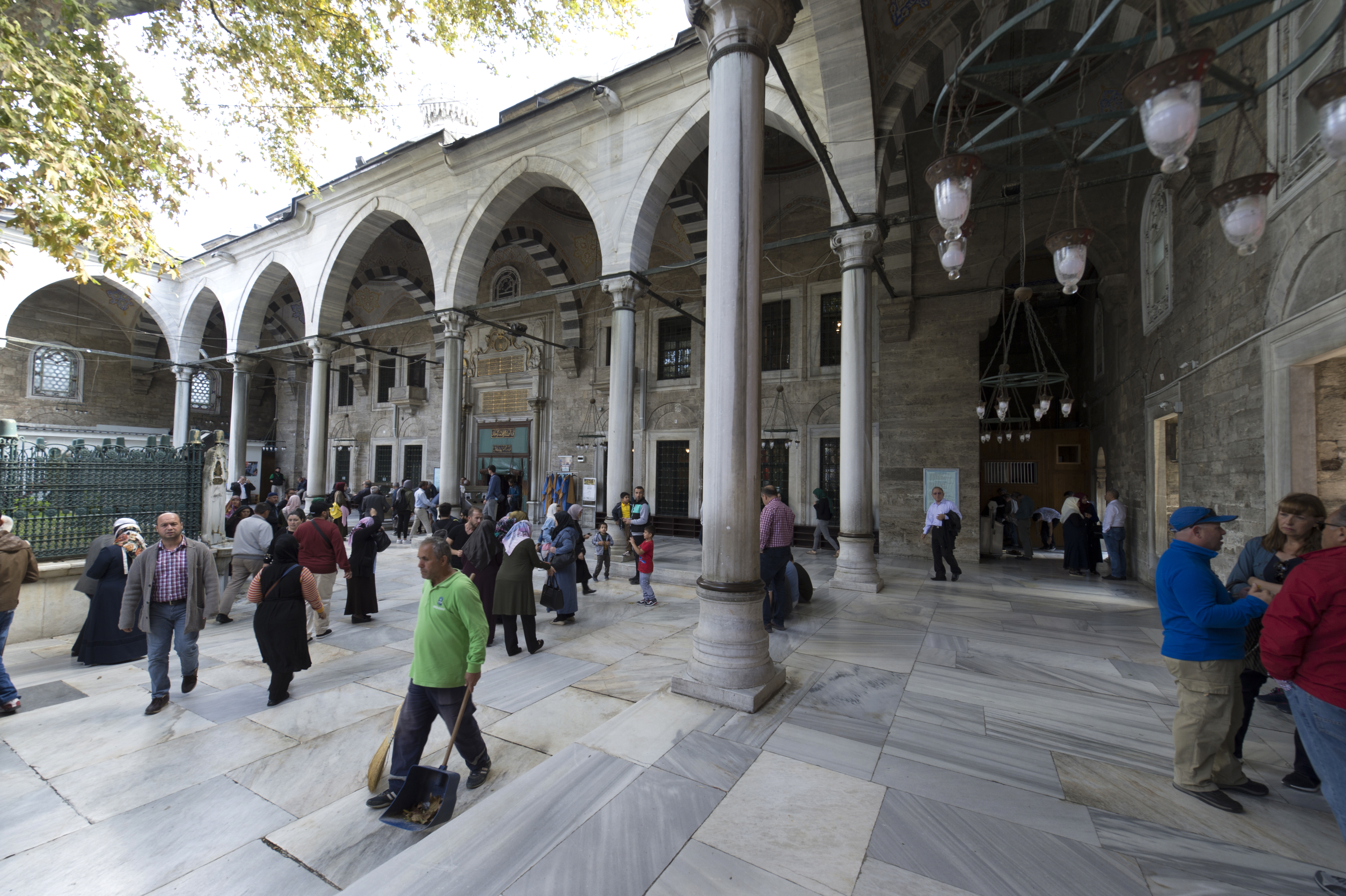
Inner courtyard, with portico in front of mosque entrance

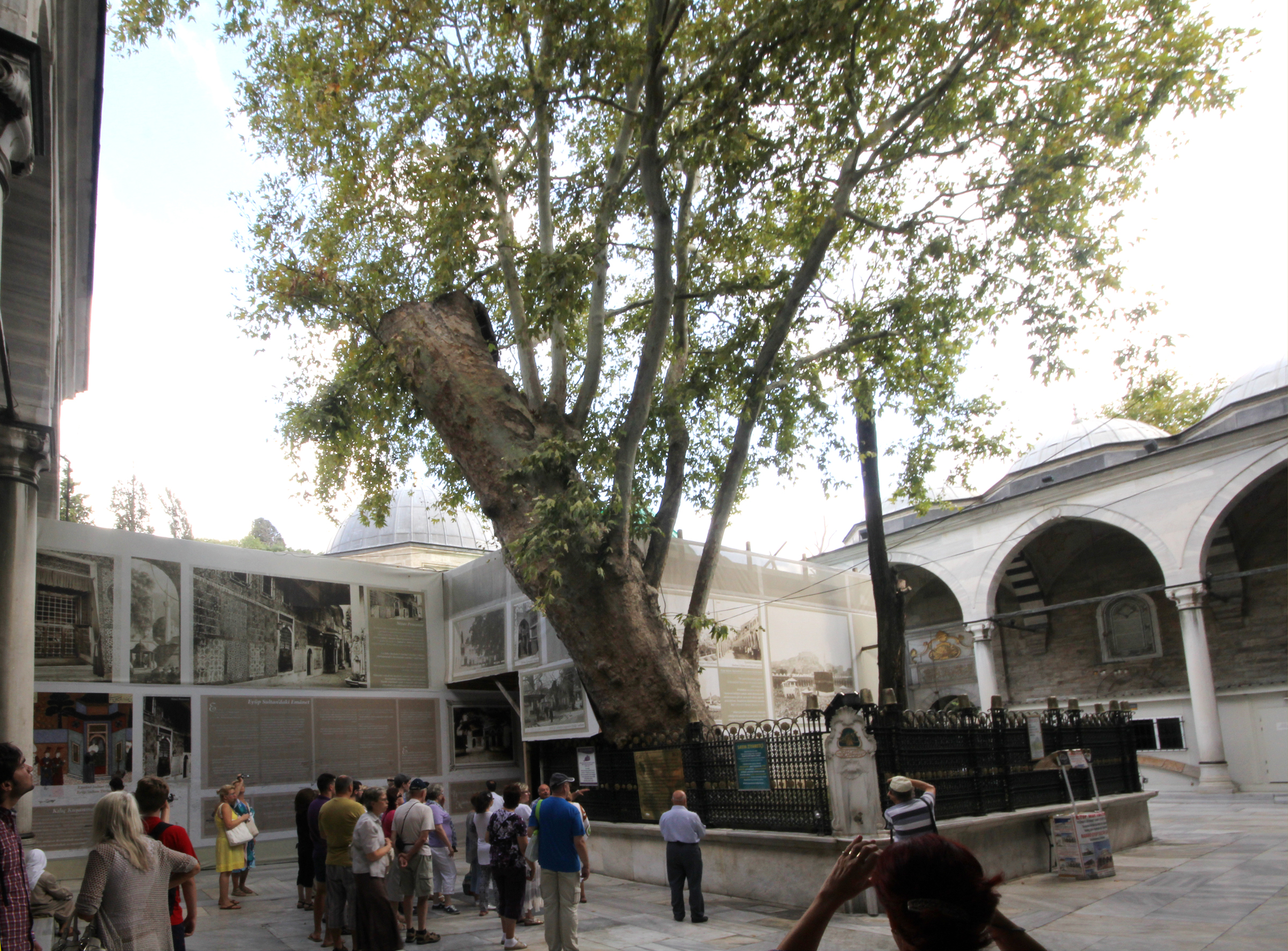
The tree and garden platform of the inner courtyard (2013 photo during restoration)

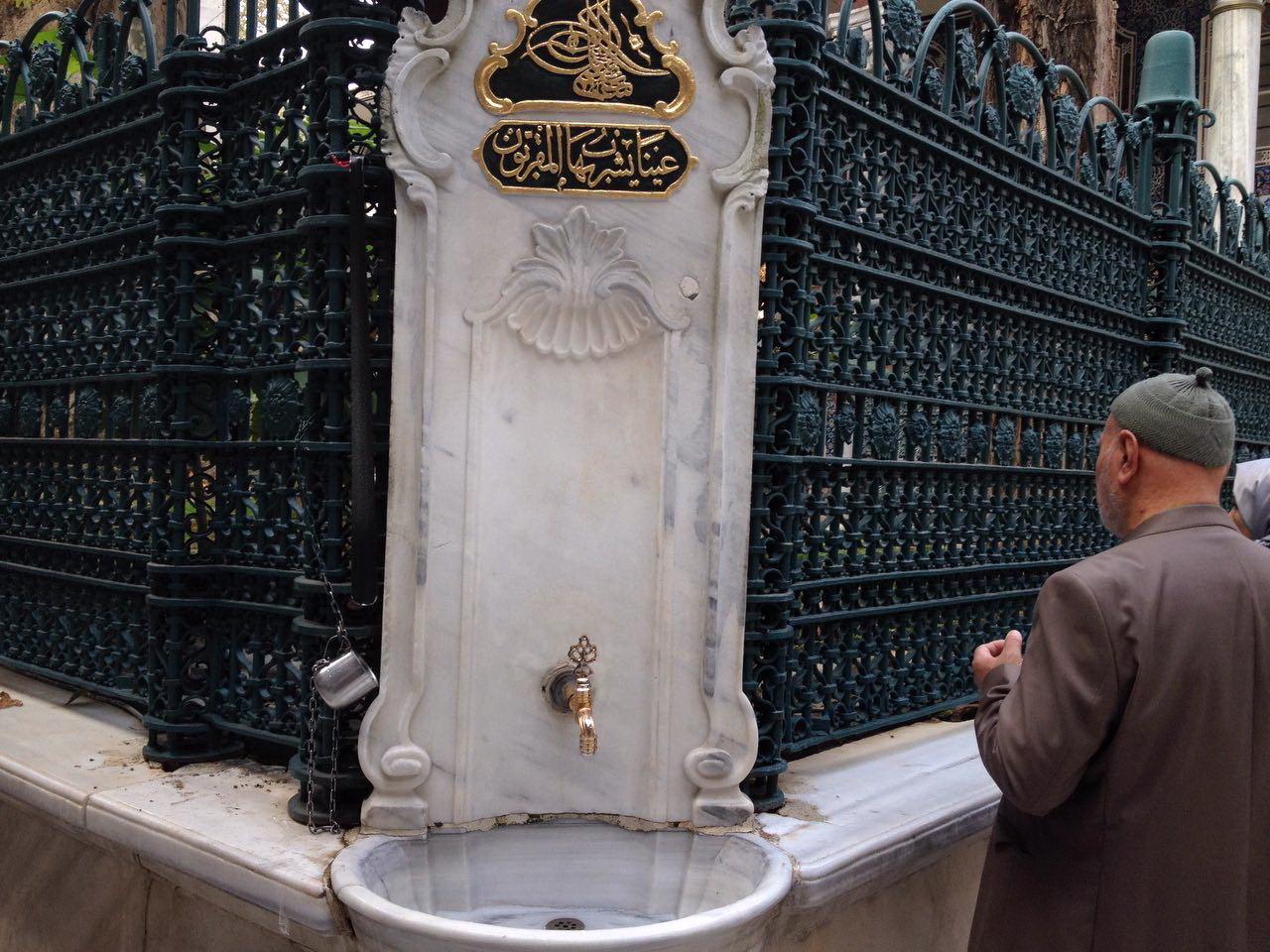
Fountain on the corner of the garden platform (Note: The inscriptions at the top include a tughra (imperial seal) above and, below it, the verse "A spring from which those nearest to God shall drink", 83:28))

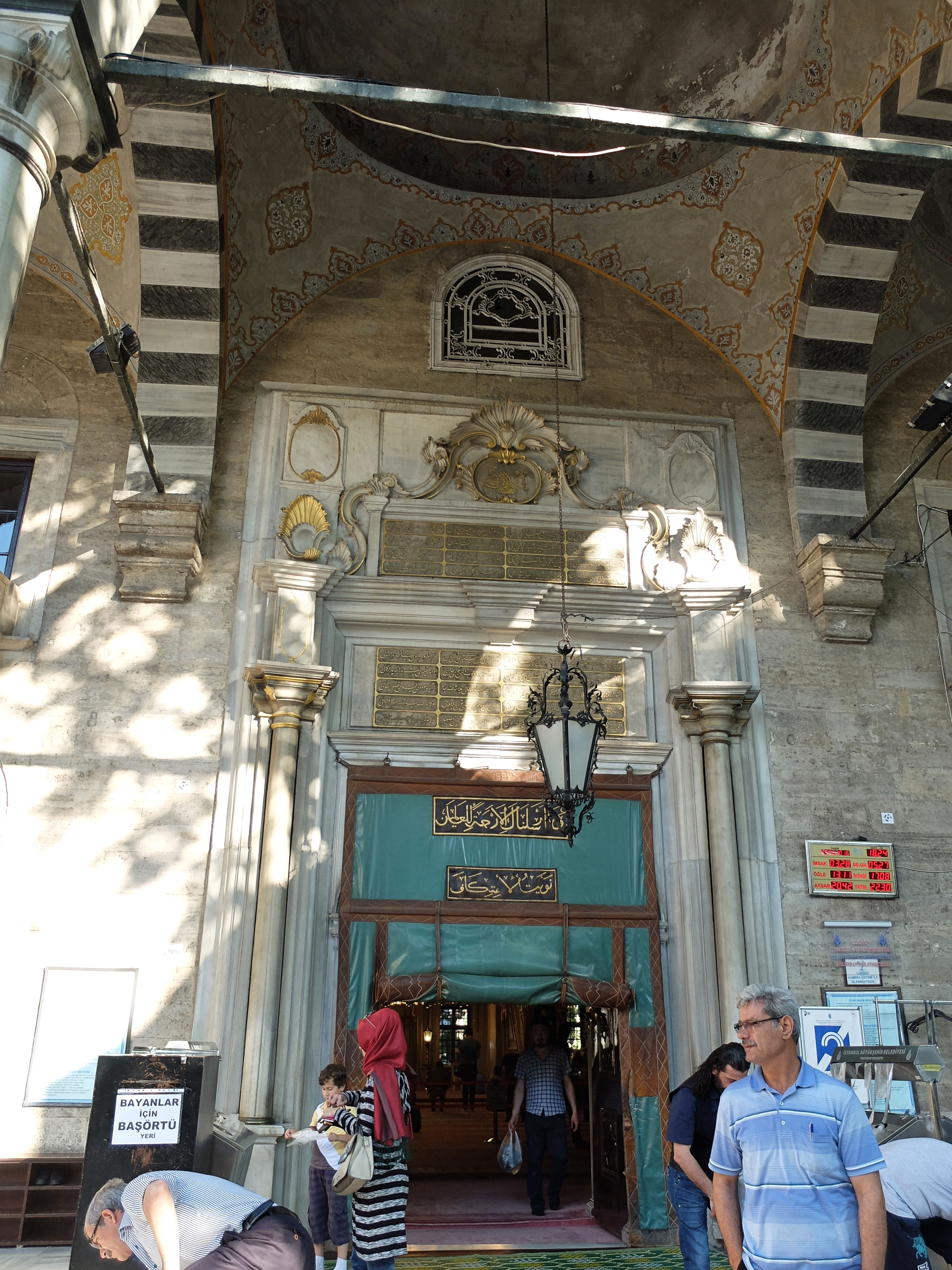
Main entrance to the mosque's interior

=== Mausoleum ===
al-Ansari's mausoleum is attached on the northwest side of the mosque's inner courtyard. The entrance is preceded by a projecting portico that extends to the edge of the courtyard's garden platform. Inside is a vestibule chamber which precedes the tomb chamber itself, which has a traditional octagonal shape covered by a dome. The sarcophagus is enclosed by a Baroque-style silver screen, additionally adorned with framed calligraphy, lamps, and other ornaments.

The mausoleum

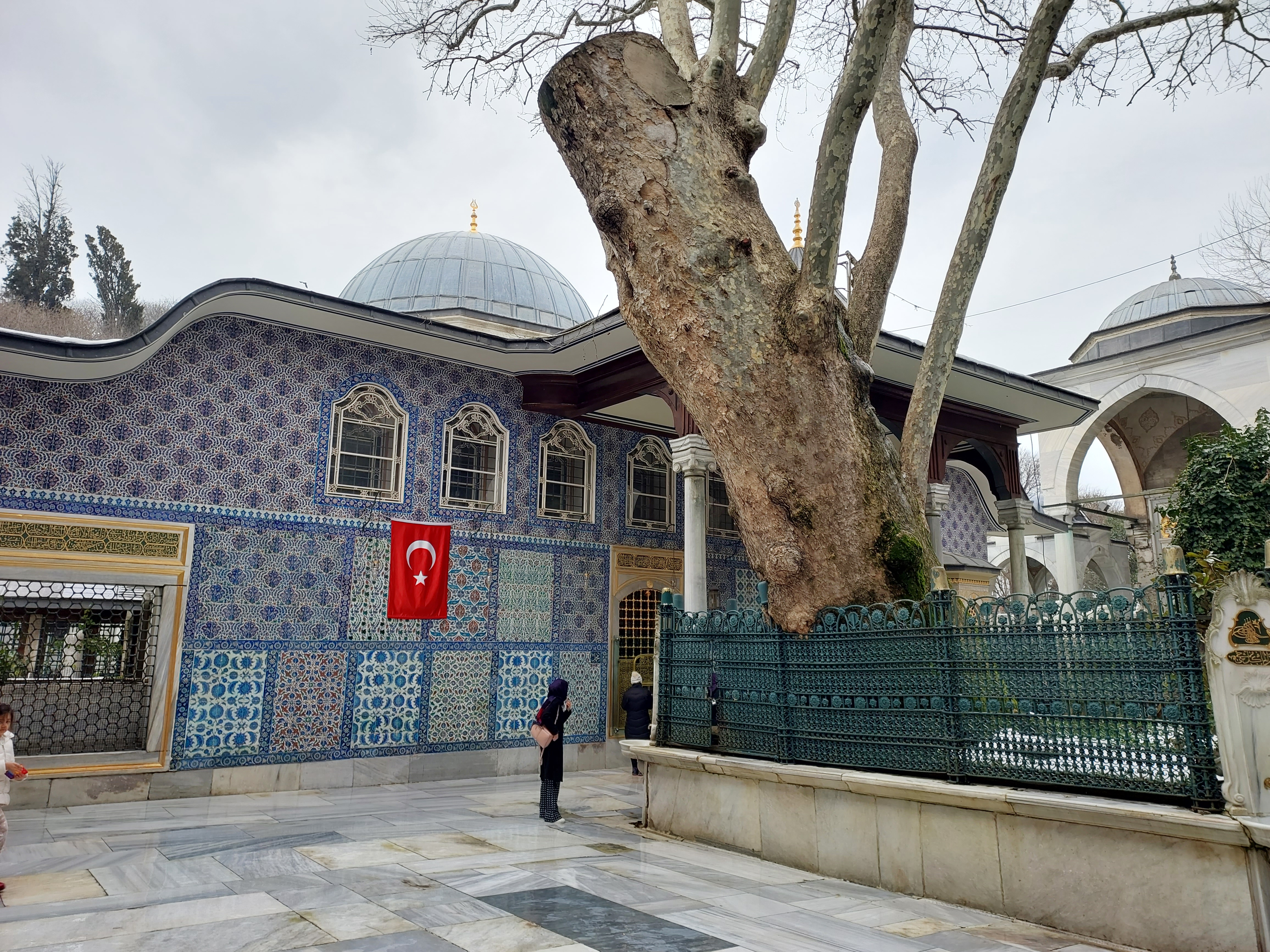
Exterior of the mausoleum of Abu Ayyub al-Ansari, seen from the mosque courtyard

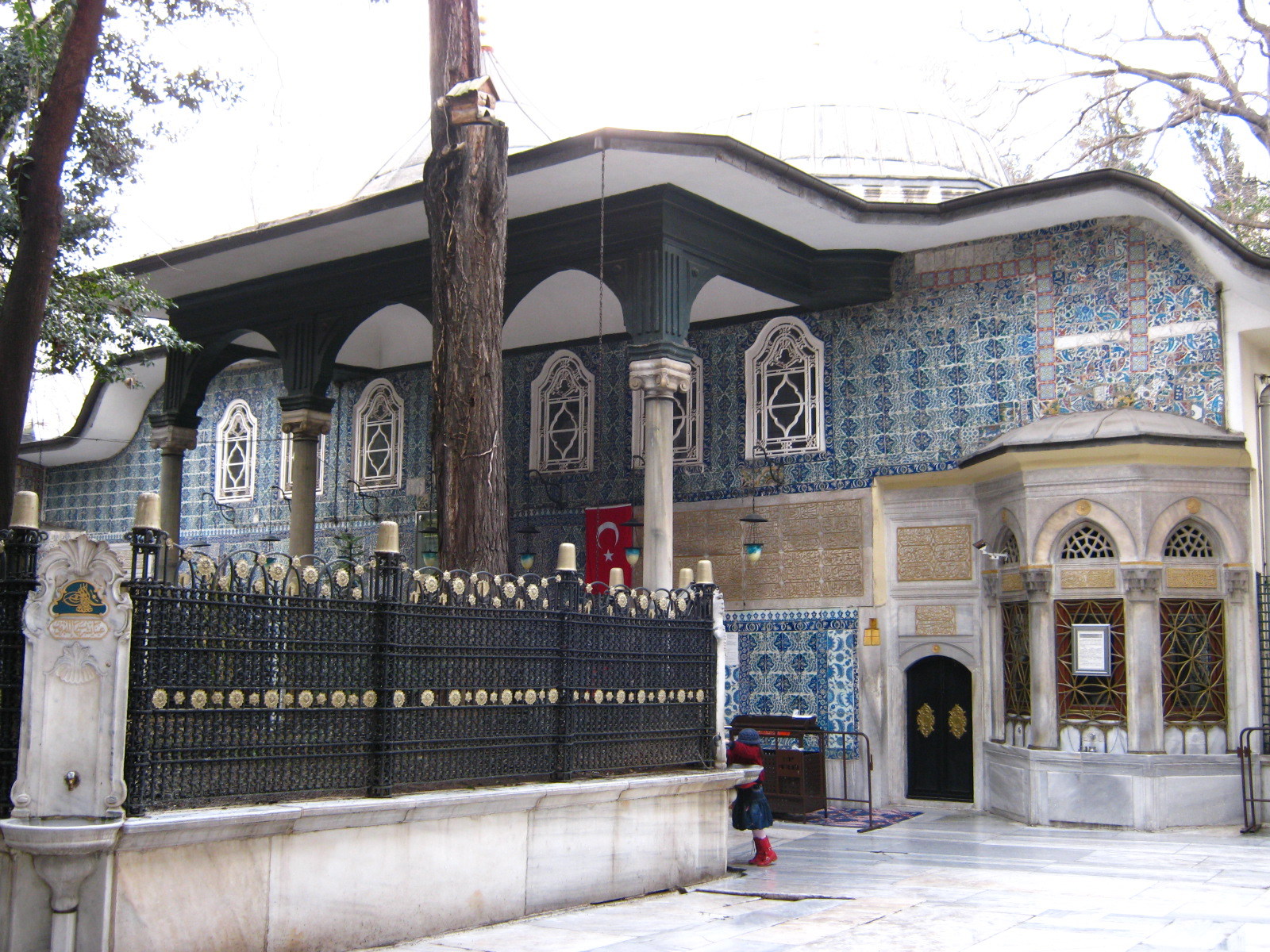
Portico and façade of the mausoleum

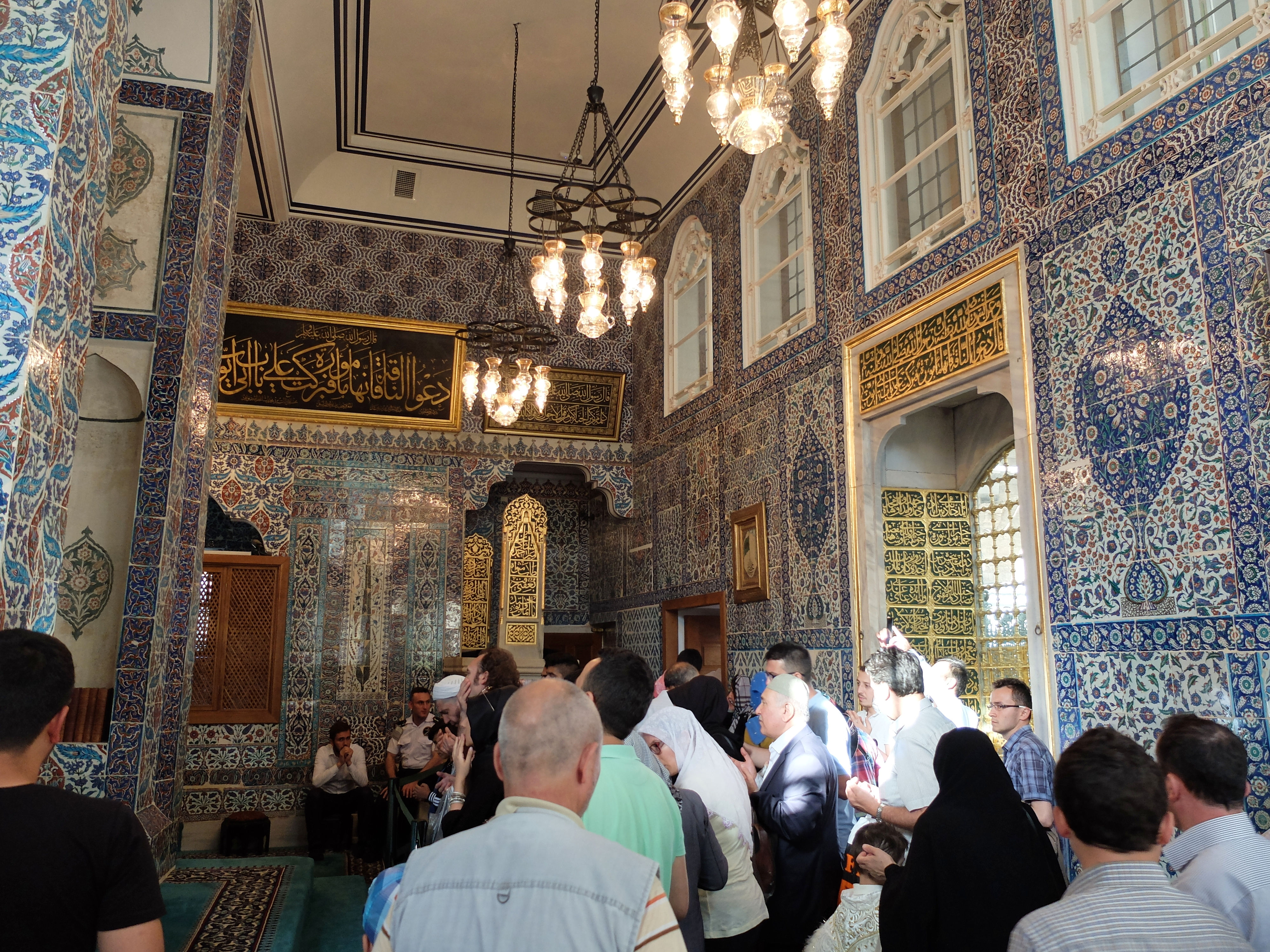
Vestibule of the mausoleum

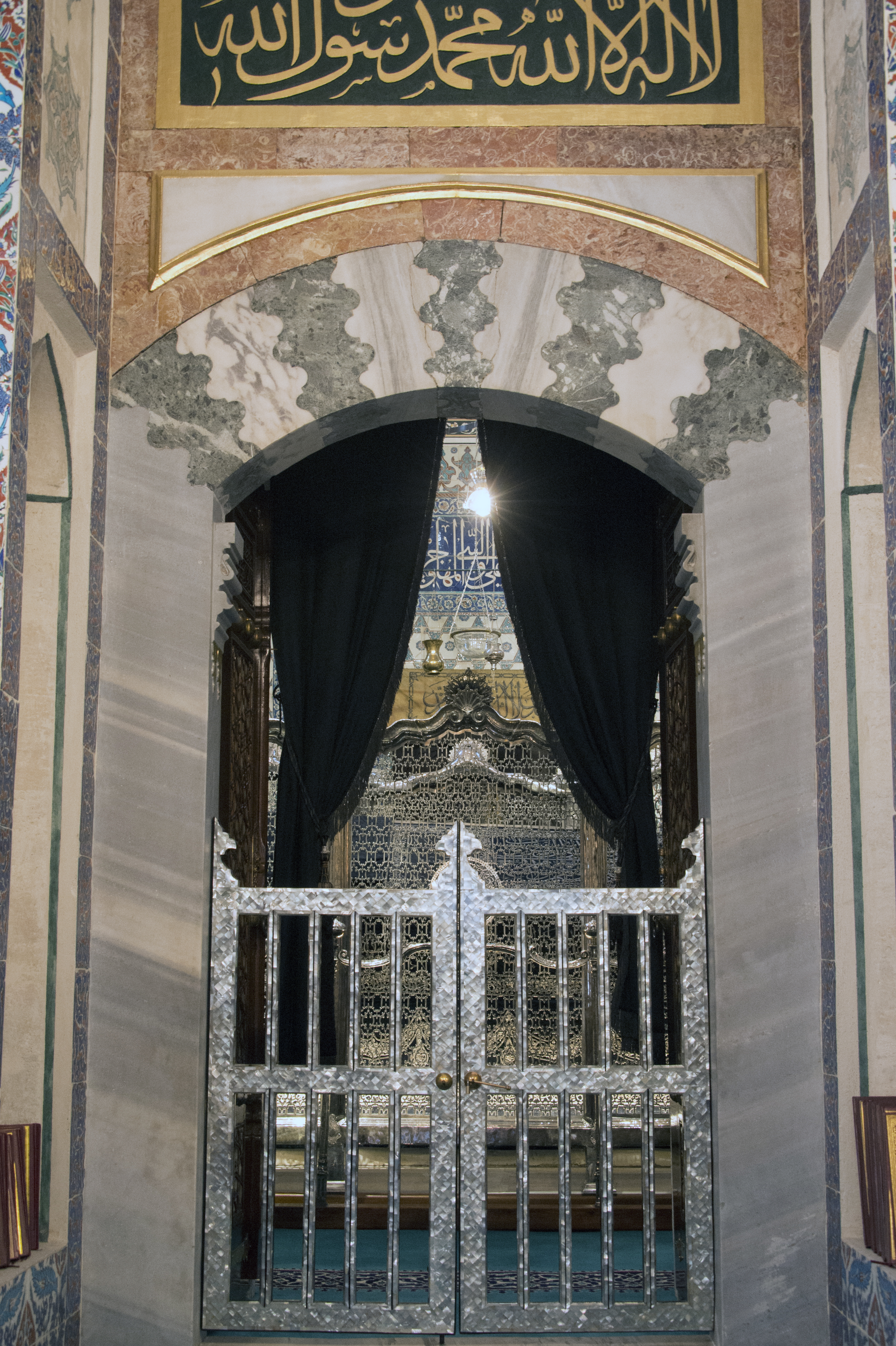
Doorway to the tomb chamber. The silver screen around the cenotaph is visible inside.

The wall of the mausoleum facing the portico is covered with panels of Iznik tiles dating from different periods and brought together during the reconstruction of the mosque in 1798–1799. The walls of the mausoleum's vestibule are also covered in Iznik tiles, many of them showing the characteristic sealing-wax red glaze known as Armenian bole and dating from around 1580, a highpoint for İznik tile design. Similar tiles in the Victoria and Albert Museum in London may once have covered the walls of the since demolished entrance hall (camekân) to the baths. (Note: The Victoria and Albert Museum in London has a panel of 24 tiles, the Louvre in Paris has a panel of eight tiles, the David Collection in Copenhagen has a tiled panel, and the Metropolitan Museum of Art in New York has a single tile. The Calouste Gulbenkian Museum in Lisbon has a panel of 10 tiles.) The British Museum also has a panel of three navy and turquoise Iznik tiles, dating from around 1550, that are similar to some of those decorating the outside wall of the shrine. In 2022 a man with a hammer damaged the tiles on either side of the dua penceresi (prayer window) in the courtyard of the mosque, claiming that devil's horns were incorporated into their design.

Tilework of the mausoleum

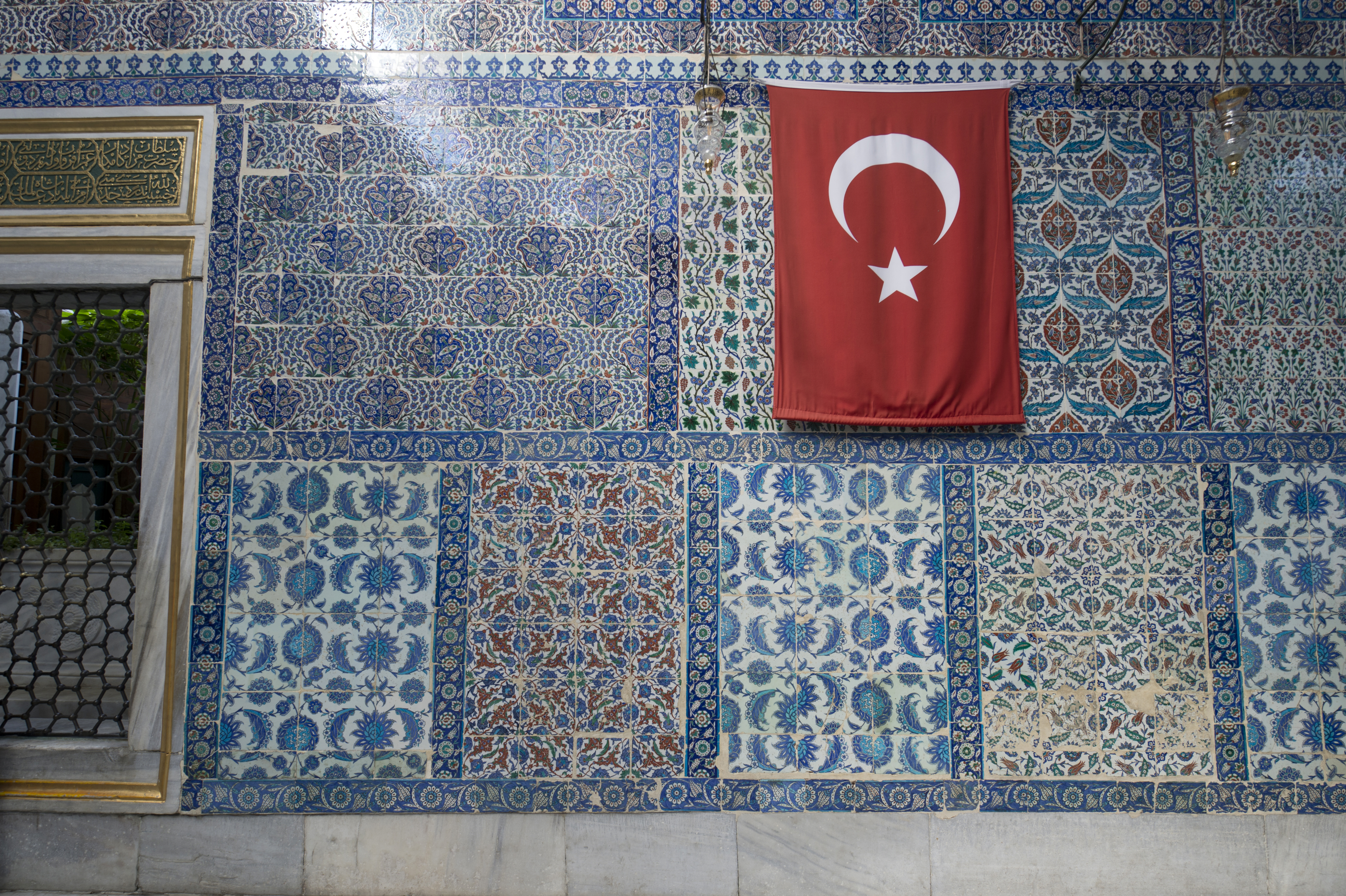
Iznik tile panels on the outside wall of the mausoleum

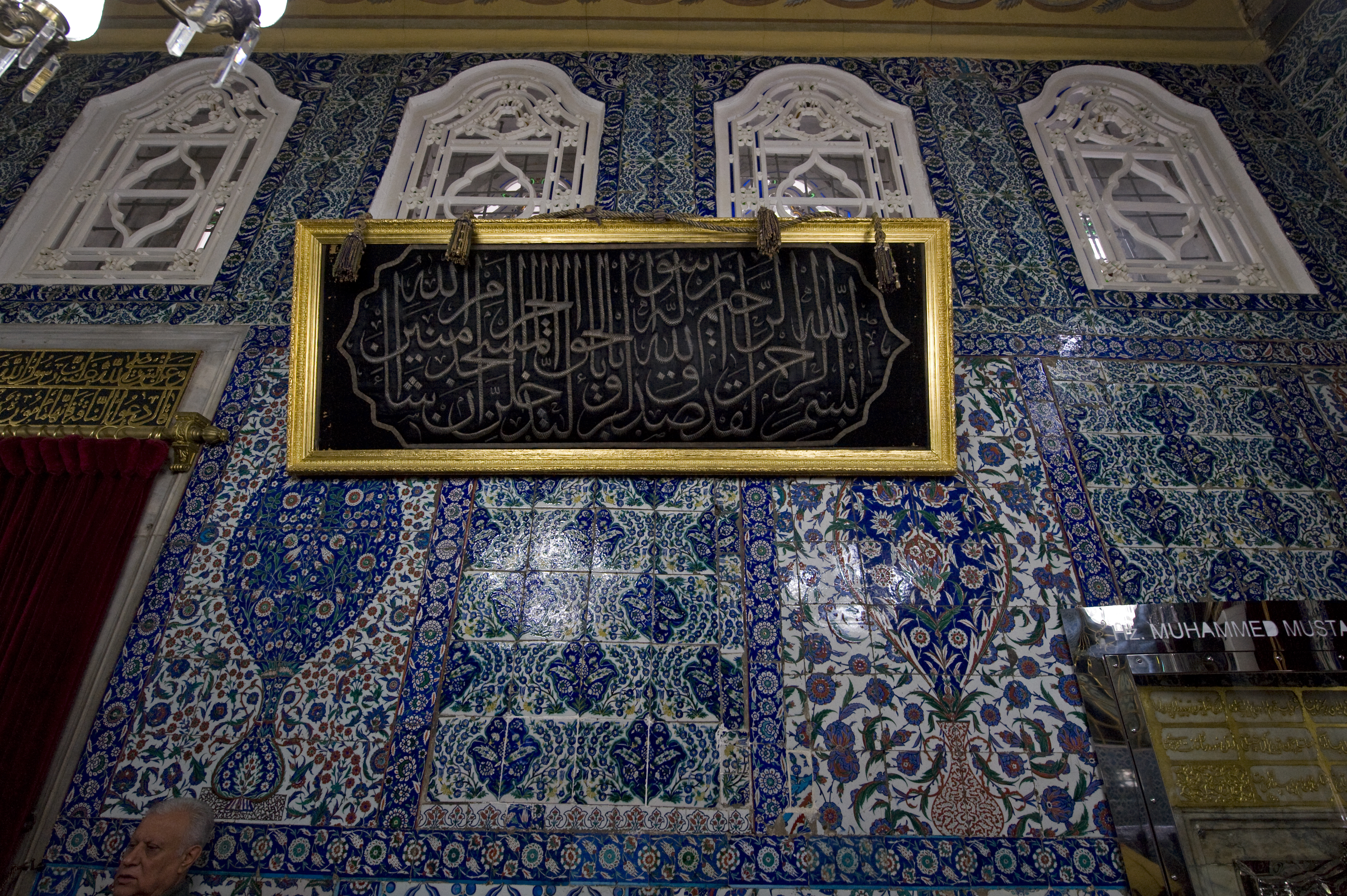
Iznik tile panels in the mausoleum's vestibule

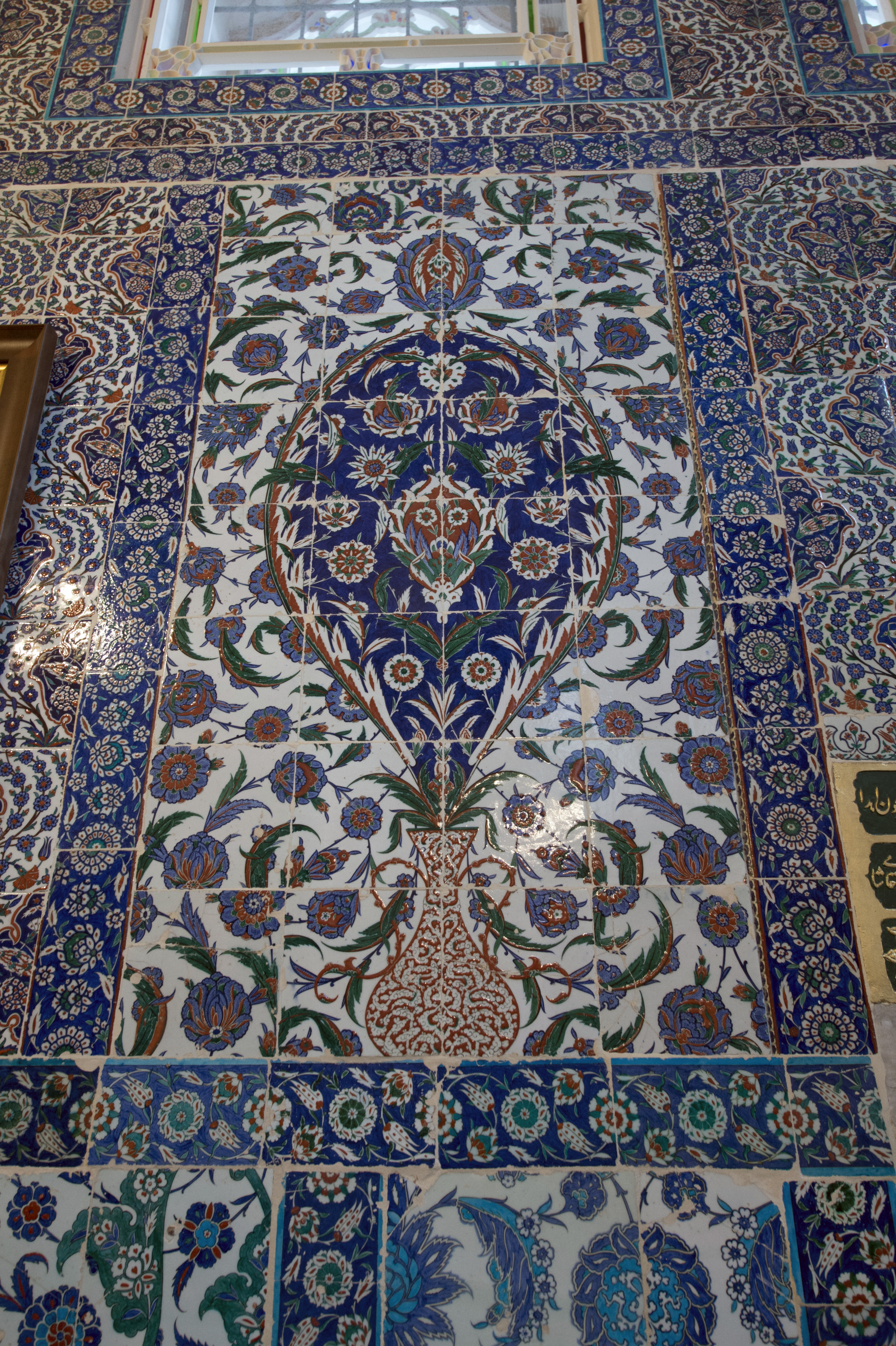
Example of Iznik tiles from their best artistic period, inside the vestibule

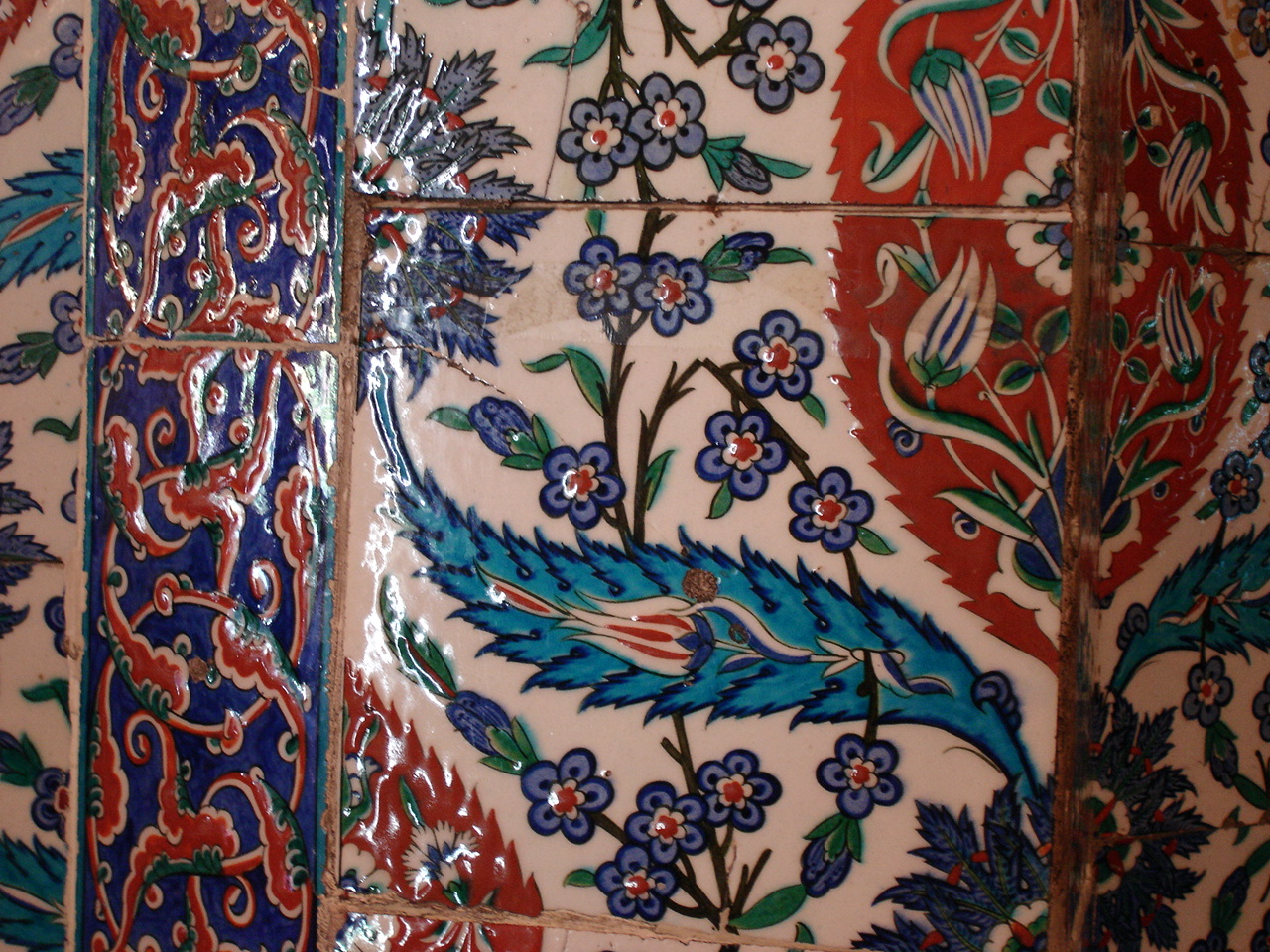
Detail of some tiles in the vestibule

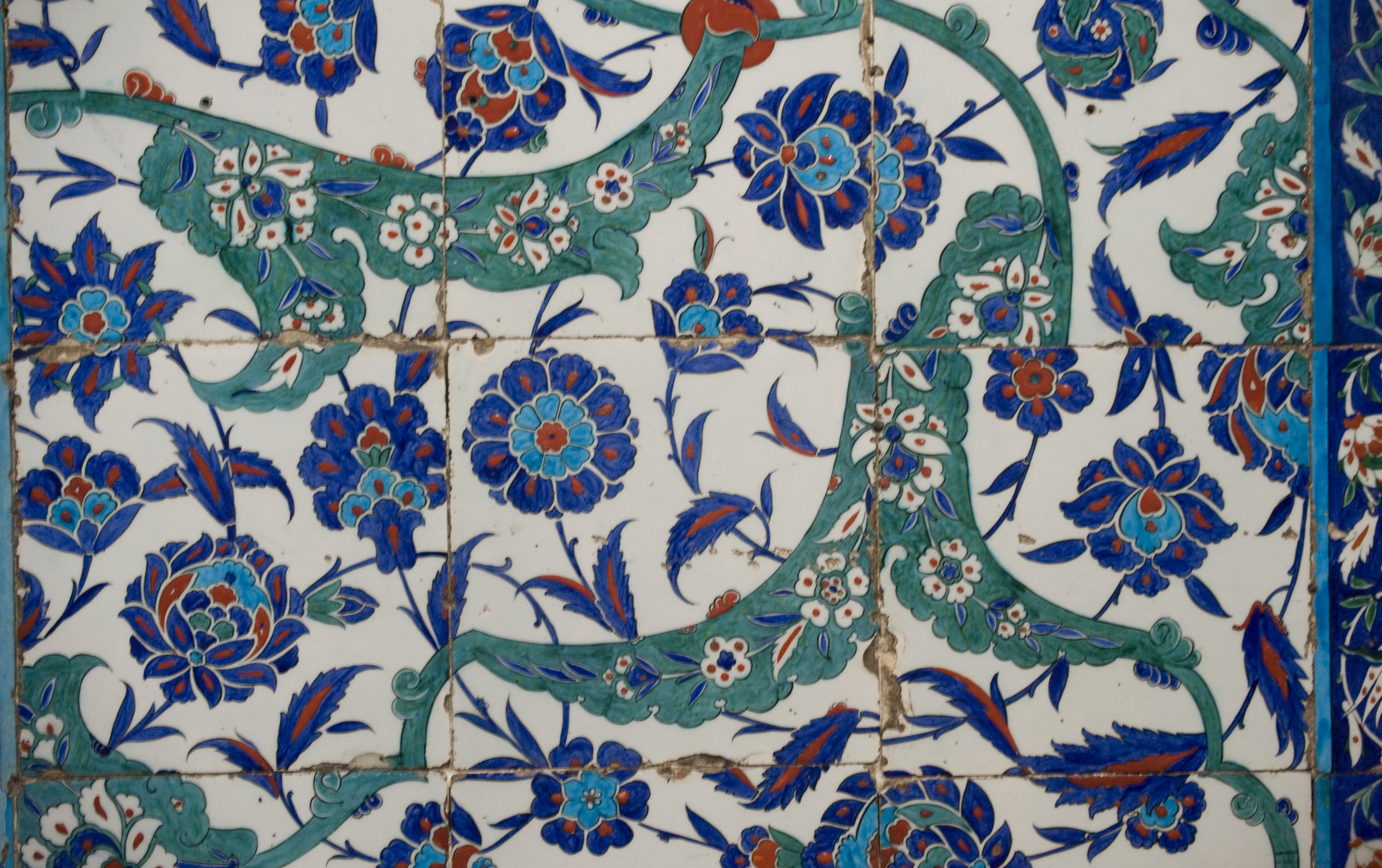
Detail of some tiles in the vestibule

=== Other structures ===
The mosque was once the centre of a larger külliye (mosque complex) including a medrese (theological school), imaret (soup kitchen), and hamam (public baths). The medrese was most likely demolished during the present mosque's reconstruction, but most of the hamam has been preserved and remains in use (although its original changing room has been replaced by a more recent wooden construction). A number of other Ottoman funerary and charitable buildings stand in the vicinity the mosque. One of the closest structures is the well-preserved imaret and tomb complex of Mihrişah Sultan (Selim III's mother), also in Baroque style. It was built several years before Selim III's reconstruction of the mosque and acts as another ancillary structure to al-Ansari's shrine.

== See also ==
- List of mosques

== Sources ==
- Atasoy, Nurhan; Raby, Julian (1989). Iznik: The Pottery of Ottoman Turkey. London: Alexandra Press. ISBN 978-1-85669-054-6.
- Goodwin, Godfrey (1971). A History of Ottoman Architecture. London: Thames and Hudson. ISBN 0-500-27429-0.
- Kuban, Doğan (2010). Ottoman Architecture. Woodbridge: Antique Collectors' Club Ltd. ISBN 978-1-85149-604-4.
- Porter, Venetia (1995). Islamic Tiles. London: British Museum Press. ISBN 978-0-7141-1456-9.
- Rüstem, Ünver (2019). Ottoman Baroque: The Architectural Refashioning of Eighteenth-Century Istanbul. Princeton: Princeton University Press. ISBN 978-0-691-18187-5.
- Sumner-Boyd, Hilary; Freely, John (2010). Strolling Through Istanbul: The Classic Guide to the City (revised ed.). London: Tauris Parke Paperbacks. ISBN 978-1-84885-154-2.
- Queiroz Ribeiro, Maria (2009). Iznik pottery and tiles in the Calouste Gulbenkian collection. Lisbon: Calouste Gulbenkian Foundation. ISBN 978-972-8848-58-3.
