= Umm Sulaym bint Milhan =

Companion (sahabiyyah) of Muhammad

Al-Rumayṣāʾ bint Milḥān (Arabic: الرميصاء بنت ملحان; died c. 650 CE; 28 AH), popularly known by her kunya as Umm Sulaym, was a follower or companion (Sahabiyyah) of Islamic prophet Muhammad and was one of the earliest women converts to Islam in Yathrib (now Medina).

== Biography ==
Umm Sulaym was the daughter of Milhan bin Khalid al-Ansari who belonged to Najjar clan of Banu Khazraj. She was the sister of Umm Haram bint Milhan and Haram bin Milhan. She was first married to Malik ibn al-Nadr and her son by this marriage was Anas ibn Malik, a notable companion of Muhammad. Ibn an-Nadr was polytheist and was angry for her conversion to Islam. He left her and went to Syria and died there.

Following the death of her first husband, Abu Talha al-Ansari resolved to become engaged to her before anyone else did. He was confident that Umm Sulaym would not pass him over for another. He was quite rich, an accomplished horseman, and a skilful archer and he belonged to the same clan as Umm Sulaym, the Banu Najjar. But she refused. Abu Talha did not take no for an answer. He asked her if there was someone more worthy for her than him, and she explained that she was a Muslim and could not marry a polytheist. He accepted Islam and they were married, and she started educating him in Islam. Abu Talhah became a devout Muslim who loved to be in the company of Muhammad. Abu Talhah died while he was on a naval expedition during the time of the caliph Uthman, and was buried at sea.

== Bibliography ==
- Az-Zirakli, Khairuddin (2002). Al-A'lām [The Names] (in Arabic). Vol. 3 (15th ed.). Beirut: Dar el-Ilm Lilmalayin.
- Kandemir, M.Yaşar (2012). "ÜMMÜ SÜLEYM". TDV Encyclopedia of Islam, Vol. 42 (Tütün – Vehran) (in Turkish). Istanbul: Presidency of Religious Affairs, Centre for Islamic Studies. pp. 330–331. ISBN 978-975-389-737-2.
