= Abu Ayyub al-Ansari =

Companion and the standard-bearer of Muhammad

Abu Ayoub Al-Ansari أبو أيوب الأنصاري
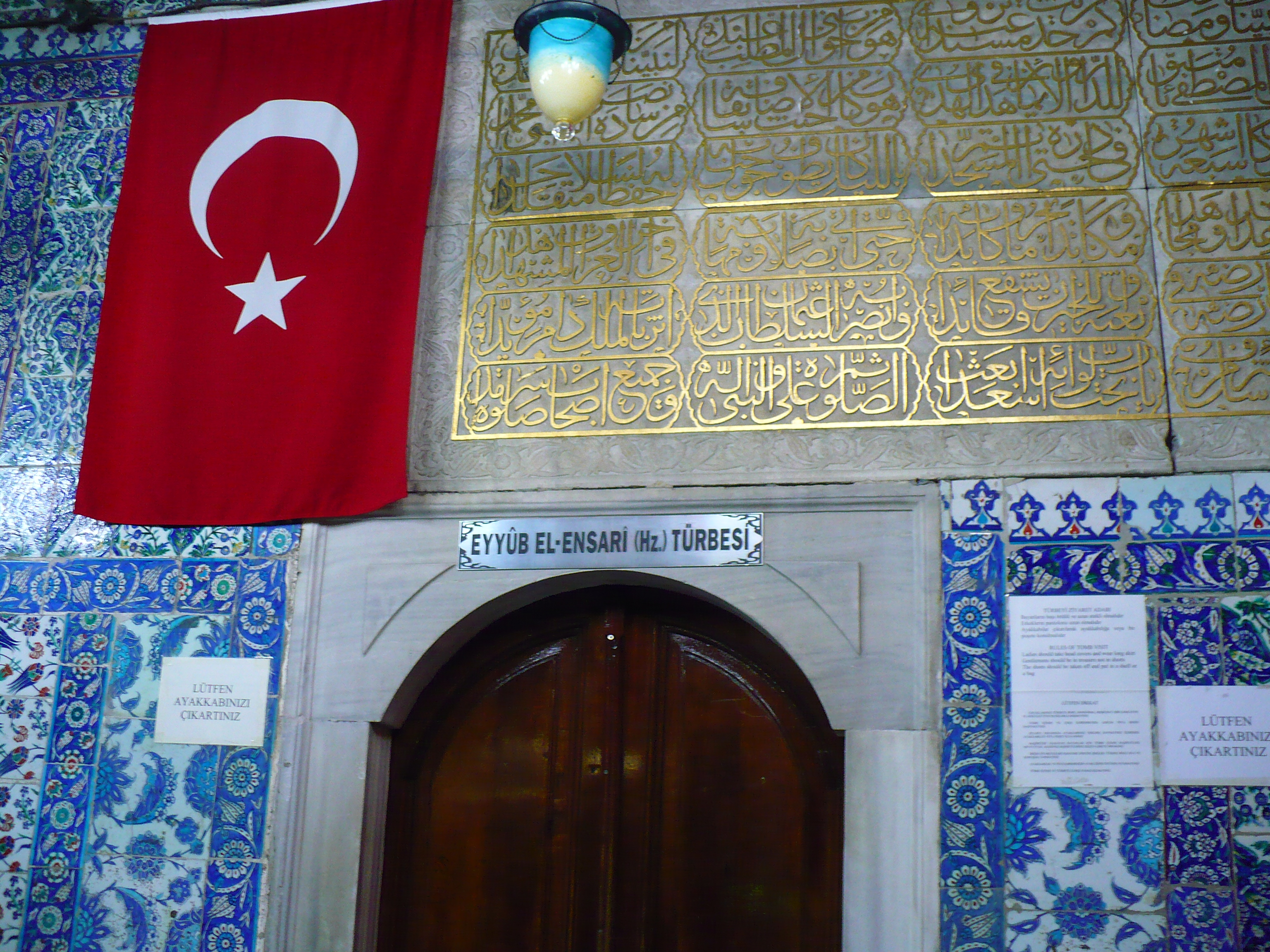
- The tomb of Abu Ayyub in Istanbul, Turkey

Rashidun governor of Medina
- Monarch: Ali
- Preceded by: Sahl ibn Hunaif (From 657)
- Succeeded by: Marwan ibn al-Hakam (662–669)

Personal details
- Born: Yathrib, Hejaz, Arabia (present-day Medina, Saudi Arabia)
- Died: c. 674 Constantinople, Byzantine Empire (present-day Istanbul, Turkey)
- Spouse(s): Umm al-Hasan bint Zayd ibn Haris; Umm al-Ayyub al-Ansari
- Relations: Banu Khazraj (Banu Najjar)
- Children: Abu Mansur al-Tabi'i; Abd al-Rahman (died as an infant); Khalid; Ayyub; Umrah
- Parents: Zayd ibn Kulayb ibn Thaalba ibn Abdul Awf al-Khazraji (father); Hind bint Saeed (mother)

Abu Ayyub al-Ansari (Arabic: أبو أيوب الأنصاري, romanized: Abū Ayyūb al-Anṣārī, Turkish: Ebu Eyyûb el-Ensarî, died c. 674) — born Khalid ibn Zayd ibn Kulayb ibn Tha'laba (Arabic: خالد ابن زيد ابن كُليب ابن ثعلبه, romanized: Khālid ibn Zayd ibn Kulayb ibn Thaʿlaba) in Yathrib — was from the tribe of Banu Najjar, and a close companion (Arabic: الصحابه, sahaba) and the standard-bearer of the Islamic prophet Muhammad. Abu Ayyub was one of the Ansar (Arabic: الأنصار, meaning aiders, helpers or patrons) of the early Islamic history, those who supported Muhammad after the hijra (migration) to Medina in 622. The patronym Abu Ayyub, means father (abu) of Ayyub. Abu Ayyub died of illness during the First Arab Siege of Constantinople.

== Biography ==
Abu Ayyub was born in Medina, Hejaz as Khalid bin Zayd to the Najjar family of the Banu Khazraj. As Abu Ayyub was the head of his family, he was one of the chosen elders in Medina who went to the valley of Aqaba and pledged allegiance to Islam at the hands of Muhammad, who named him Abu Ayyub al-Ansari. After the migration, Muhammad united the Muhajiruns and Ansars into a single allegiance.

=== Waqif in Al-Masjid an-Nabawi ===
Waqif of Al-Masjid an-Nabawi: The land of Al-Masjid an-Nabawi belonged to two young orphans, Sahal and Suhayl, and when they learned that Prophet Muhammad wished to acquire their land for a mosque, they went to Prophet Muhammad and offered the land to him as a gift. Prophet Muhammad insisted on paying for the land because they were orphaned children. The ultimately agreed purchase price was paid by Abu Ayyub al-Ansari who thus became the waqif (or creator of a charitable endowment) of Al-Masjid an-Nabawi on behalf of Prophet Muhammad.

He was chosen as the Rashidun governor of Medina during the caliphate of Ali ibn Abi Talib.

=== Life in Egypt ===
Following the Muslim conquest of Egypt, Abu Ayyub moved to Fustat, where he lived in a house adjacent to the mosque of Amr bin Al'aas that had been completed in 642. Several other companions were his neighbours, including Zubayr ibn al-Awwam, Ubaida, Abu Dhar, Abdullah ibn Umar and Abdullah ibn Amr bin Al'aas.

During his military career, "he did not stay away from any battle in which the Muslims engaged from the time of Muhammad to the time of Muawiyah I, unless he was at the same time, engaged in another battle being fought elsewhere."

=== Last military campaign ===
In a hadith in Qital al-Rome, a chapter of Sahih Muslim, Muhammad prophesied that the first army to charge Constantinople will enter Paradise.

Muhammad ibn Jarir al-Tabari records a number of raids against the Byzantine Empire under the period A.H. 49 (9/2/669 - 28/1/670). Though Abu Ayyub was by then an old man, that did not deter him from enlisting. Shortly after engaging in battle, it is recorded that he fell ill and had to withdraw. The chief of army staff Yazid ibn Muawiya asked, "Do you need anything, Abu Ayyub?" to which Abu Ayyub replied, "Convey my salaams (Islamic greeting and farewell) to the Muslim armies and tell them, 'Abu Ayyub urges you to penetrate deep into enemy territory, as far as you can go; and that you should carry him with you, and that you should bury me under your feet at the walls of Constantinople.'" At this, he died. Yazid ordered the Muslim army to fulfil his request, and they pushed back the enemy's forces until they reached the walls of Constantinople where Abu Ayyub was finally interred.

About this battle, Aslam ibn 'Imran narrates that when they were fighting the Byzantines, a Muslim soldier penetrated deep into enemy ranks. The people exclaimed, "Subhan Allah! He has contributed to his own destruction." Abu Ayyub al-Ansari stood up and answered, "O people! You give this interpretation to this verse, whereas it was revealed concerning us the Ansar. When Allah had actually given honour to Islam and its supporters had become many, some of us secretly said to one another, 'Our wealth has been depleted, and Allah has given honour to Islam and its supporters have become many, let us stay amidst our wealth and make up what has been depleted of it.' Thereupon, Allah revealed to Muhammad, 'And spend in the Path of God (فِي سَبِيلِ اللّهِ), and do not contribute to your own destruction / And spend in the way of Allah and do not throw [yourselves] with your [own] hands into destruction [by refraining].'," refuting what we had said.

== Descendants ==
The descendants of Abu Ayyub can be found around the Arabian Peninsula and Indian subcontinent. Two of his sons, Khalid and Ayyub, remained in the Arabian Peninsula and their descendants traveled to other countries such as Qatar and Bahrain. His other son, Abu Mansur Ummatul Ansari took part in the Muslim conquest of Khorasan under the Muslim general Ahnaf ibn Qais. He settled in Herat and his family remained there until 1526. The prominent Hanbali scholar from Herat, Abdullah Ansari was descended from Abu Ayyub through his son, Abu Mansur. Consequently, the family migrated to the Indian subcontinent with the Mughal emperor Babur.

== Mosque and türbe ==
“built of white marble by Mehmed II, the Conqueror, in 1459, adjacent to the türbeh of Abu Eyúb Ensari, the legendary standard-bearer of the prophet, whose tomb here was revealed in a vision a few days after the conquest…”

— Baedeker's The Mediterranean, seaports and sea routes: Handbook for Travellers, 1911

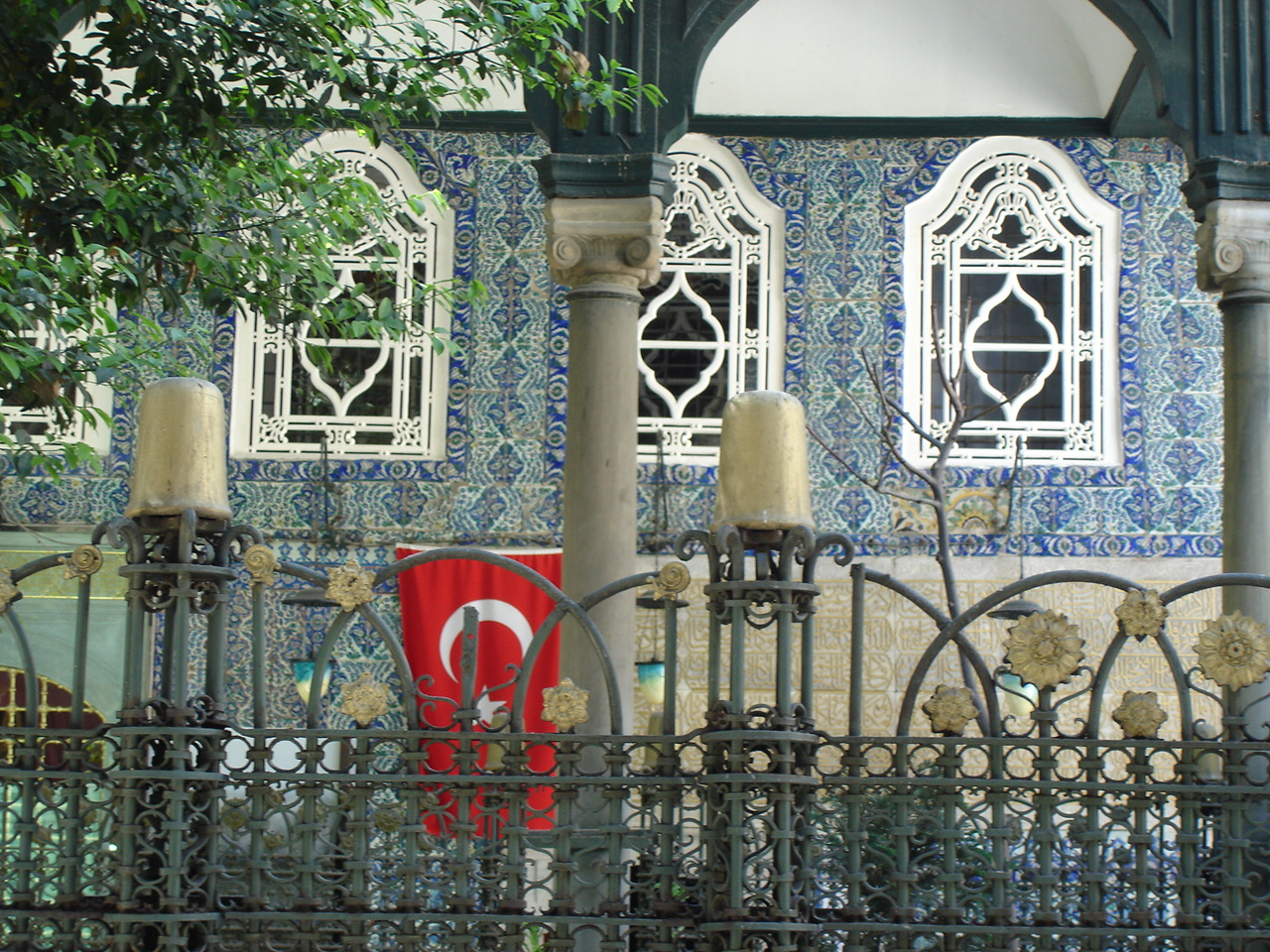
The türbe of Abu Ayyub al-Ansari

After the Conquest of Constantinople by the Ottoman Turks, a tomb was constructed above Abu Ayyub's grave and a mosque built in his honour by Sultan Mehmed the Conqueror. From that point on, the area now known as the locality of Eyüp became sacred and many Ottoman officials requested burial in proximity of Abu Ayyub. His tomb was discovered by the Ottoman saint Akşemseddin. The tomb was rebuilt by Sultan Mahmud II in 1822. This mosque was the traditional site for the coronation ceremony of the Ottoman Sultans, where each new Sultan was girded with the Sword of Osman, the founder of the Ottoman Empire. Obeying the order of Sheikh Edebali, Osman I had gone to the tomb of Abu Ayyub al-Ansari.

== Some hadith narrated by Abu Ayyub ==
Abu Ayyub al-Ansari is credited with narrating many sayings of Muhammad. Well-known examples of these include:

- The Messenger of Allah said: "It is not permissible for a Muslim to shun his brother for more than three nights. When they meet, this one turns away (from that one) and that one turns away (from this one) and the best of them is the one who greets his brother first."
- Abu Ayyub al-Ansari narrates that on the night of Mi'raj, Muhammad passed by Ibrahim (Abraham). Ibrahim asked, "O Jibreel, who is with you?" Jibreel answered, "Muhammad." Ibrahim said to him, "Command your Ummah to plant trees of Paradise in abundance, as the soil of Paradise is fertile and its plain is spacious." It was asked, "Which are the trees of Paradise?" He replied, "La hawla wa la quwwata illa billah (Arabic لا حول ولا قوة إلا بالله)."
- Sa‘d ibn Sa‘id ibn Qays informed me, from ‘Umar ibn Thabit ibn al-Harith al-Khazraji, from Abu Ayyub al-Ansari — may Allah be pleased with him — that he narrated to him that the Messenger of Allah ﷺ said: ‘Whoever fasted Ramadan, then followed it with six from Shawwal, it was like fasting the entire time (ad-dahr).’”

== See also ==
- Sunni view of the Sahaba

== Bibliography ==
- Goodwin, Godfrey (1971). A History of Ottoman Architecture. London: Thames and Hudson. ISBN 0-500-27429-0.
- Khalifah ibn Khayyat (1985). al-Umari, Akram Diya' (ed.). Tarikh Khalifah ibn Khayyat, 3rd ed (in Arabic). Al-Riyadh: Dar Taybah.
- Muhammad ibn Jarir al-Tabari, History v. 18 "Between Civil Wars: The Caliphate of Mu'awiyah," transl. Michael G. Morony, SUNY Press, Albany, 1987.
- Muhammad Ibn Sa'd, Kitab at-Tabaqat al-Kabir, np, nd.
- Hitti, Philip K. (1951). A History of the Arabs (Revised ed.). London. OCLC 398068.
- Yarshater, Ehsan, ed. (1985–2007). The History of al-Ṭabarī (40 vols). SUNY Series in Near Eastern Studies. Albany, New York: State University of New York Press. ISBN 978-0-7914-7249-1.
- Talib Hashmi, Seerat Mezban e Rasool (SAW) Hazrat Abu Ayub Ansari (R.A), Lahore; Taha pub; 2005
- Mahmud Ansari, Ansaris of Yusufpur 2013
