= Anas ibn Malik =

Companion (sahabi) of Muhammad

Anas ibn Mālik أنس بن مالك
- Born: c. 612 CE; Yathrib, Hejaz, Arabia (present-day Saudi Arabia)
- Died: c. 712 CE (93 AH) (aged 100); Basra, Umayyad Caliphate (present-day Iraq)
- Burial place: Basra, Iraq
- Other names: Ibn Malik; Abu Hamza
- Era: Early Islam; Rashidun Caliphate; Umayyad Caliphate
- Known for: Transmitter of Hadiths; Last living companion of Muhammad
- Notable work: Hadith
- Title: Khadim al-Nabi
- Parents: Malik ibn Nadr (father); Umm Sulaym (mother)
- Relatives: Al-Bara' ibn Malik (sibling); Abdullah ibn Abi Talha (step-brother); Abu Talha al-Ansari (step-father)
- Family: Banu Najjar (from Banu Khazraj)

Anas ibn Mālik ibn Naḍr al-Khazrajī al-Anṣārī (Arabic: أنس بن مالك الخزرجي الأنصاري; c. 612 – c. 712) was a companion of the Islamic prophet Muhammad. He was nicknamed Khadim al-Nabi (lit. Servant of the Prophet) for serving Muhammad for ten years.

== Biography ==
Anas ibn Malik, a member of the Najjar clan of the Khazraj tribe of Yathrib, was born in 612, ten years before the Hijrah. Anas ibn Malik's father was Malik ibn Nadr and his mother was Umm Sulaym. His father, Malik ibn Nadr was a non-Muslim and was angry with his mother, Umm Sulaym for her conversion to Islam. Malik bin Nadr went to Damascus and died there. She remarried to a new convert, Abu Talha al-Ansari. Anas's half-brother from this marriage was Abdullah ibn Abi Talha.

When Muhammad arrived in Medina in 622, Anas's mother presented him to Muhammad as a servant to him. Under the leadership of Muhammad, he participated in major events including Treaty of al-Hudaybiya, Battle of Khaybar, Conquest of Mecca, Siege of Taif and the Farewell Pilgrimage.

After Muhammad's death in 632, Anas participated in the early Muslim conquests. In 638 AD (17 H), Anas went to Basra when Abu Musa al-Ash'ari was its governor.

He was considered as the last of the prominent companions of Muhammad to die, having outlived Muhammad by 80 years. Anas died in 93 AH (712 CE) in Basra at the age of 103 (lunar) years.

== Tomb ==
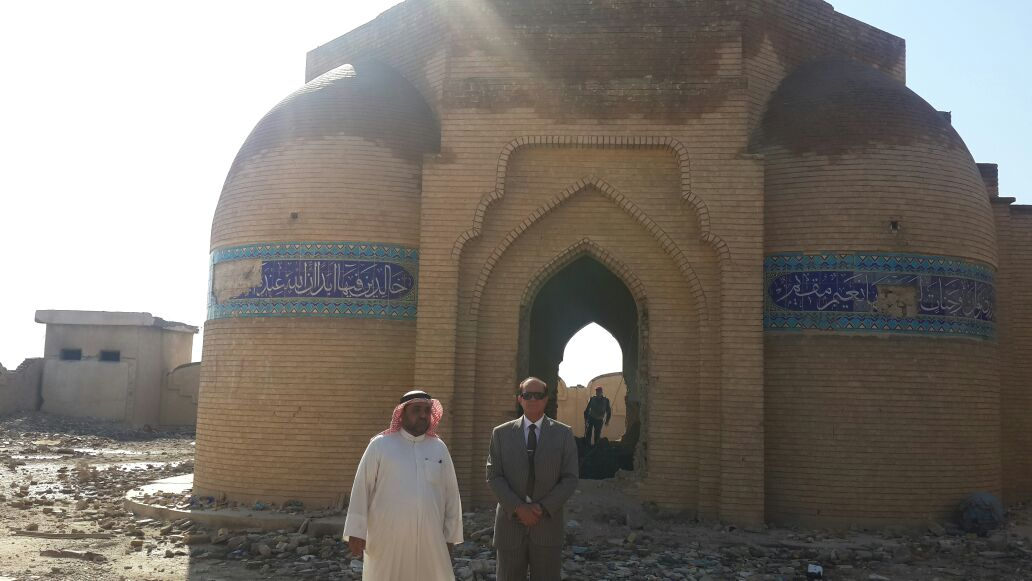
Tomb of Anas ibn Malik in Basra, Iraq

The tomb of Anas ibn Malik is located 20 minutes away from Basra's city center. It was damaged in 2016 during the war in Iraq and has not yet been reconstructed by the Iraqi government.

However, the shrine was destroyed with explosive devices. The mosque and shrine is heavily damaged and walls stained with vandalism. The complex is still visited by Muslims, but the shrine doors have been sealed with concrete preventing pilgrims from entering and the deceased from being visited.

== See also ==
- 7th century in Lebanon § Ṣaḥāba who have visited Lebanon
- Anas ibn Nadhar
- List of Sahabah

== Sources ==
- Juynboll, G.H.A. (2011). "Anas b. Mālik". In Fleet, Kate; Krämer, Gudrun; Matringe, Denis; Nawas, John; Rowson, Everett (eds.). Encyclopaedia of Islam (3rd ed.). Brill Online. doi:10.1163/1573-3912_ei3_COM_23088. ISSN 1873-9830.
- Canan, İbrahım (1995). "Enes b. Mâlik". TDV Encyclopedia of Islam, Vol. 11 (Elbi̇stan – Eymi̇r) (in Turkish). Istanbul: Presidency of Religious Affairs, Centre for Islamic Studies. pp. 234–235. ISBN 978-975-389-438-8.
