= Banu Najjar =

Arab tribe

Banu Najjar بَنُو نَجَّار
- Tribe
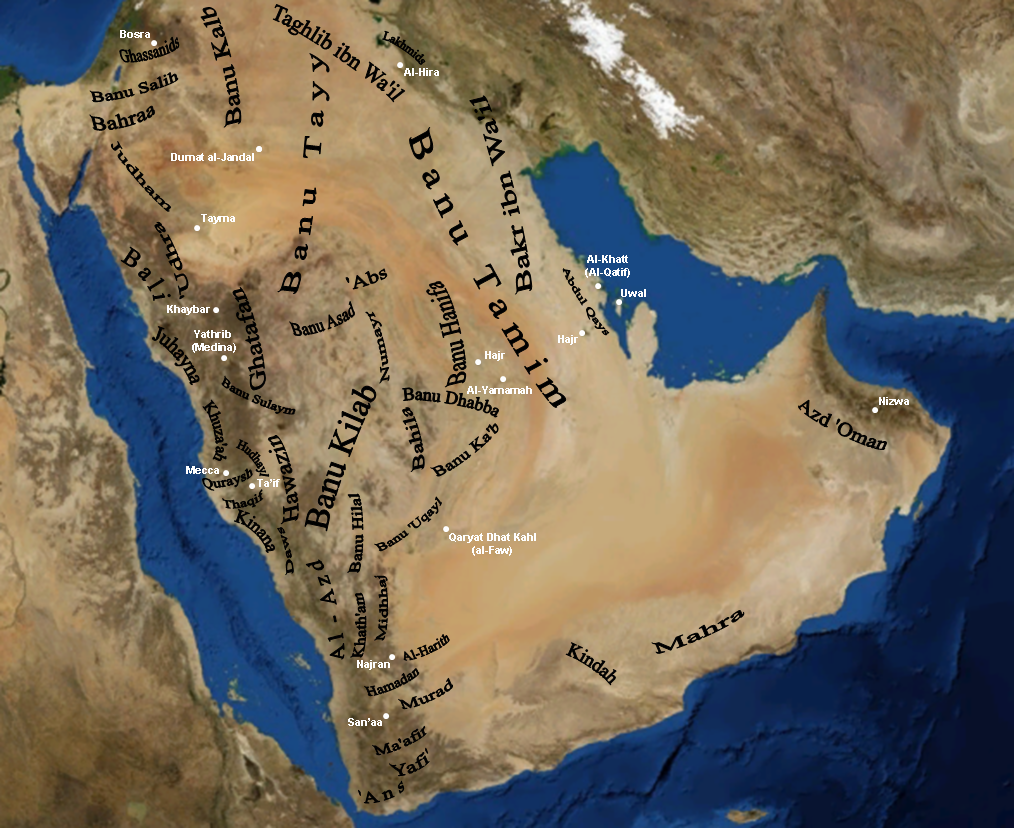
- Several Historical Tribes of Arabia
- Nisba: Najjari; Khazraji
- Location: Yathrib, Hejaz, Arabia
- Descended from: Azd (Banu Khazraj)
- Parent tribe: Azd (Banu Khazraj)
- Religion: Islam

Map of the Arabian Peninsula in 600 AD, showing the various Arab tribes and their areas of settlement. The Lakhmids (yellow) formed an Arab monarchy as clients of the Sasanian Empire, while the Ghassanids (red) formed an Arab monarchy as clients of the Roman Empire A map published by the British academic Harold Dixon during World War I, showing the presence of the Arab tribes in West Asia, 1914

Banu Najjar (Arabic: بَنُو نَجَّار, "sons of the carpenter") or Banu al-Naggar is the name of several unrelated historical and modern-day tribes throughout the Arab world. The individual tribes vary in religious composition.

== In Islamic history ==
One Banu Najjar group is mentioned in the Charter of Medina, and the Banu Najjar of Medina were the maternal clan of Muhammad's grandfather Abdul-Muttalib. Islamic historians like Ibn Hajar al-Asqalani and al-Tabari list them as a clan of the large Banu Khazraj tribe of Medina. Al-Asqalani states that their ancestor was Taymallah ibn Thalabah ibn Amr ibn al-Khazraj. The Banu Najjar had at least three sub-clans.

Before Islam, the Banu Najjar of Medina practiced notably traditional Arab polytheism, and owned idols named Samul, Husa, and at-Tamm that were destroyed after the clan converted to Islam. They may have had a tribal alliance with Jews of Medina.

Muhammad initially settled with them when he emigrated from Mecca to Medina. The Prophet's Mosque was later built in the tribe's garden. The Banu Najjar are praised in a hadith attributed to Muhammad.

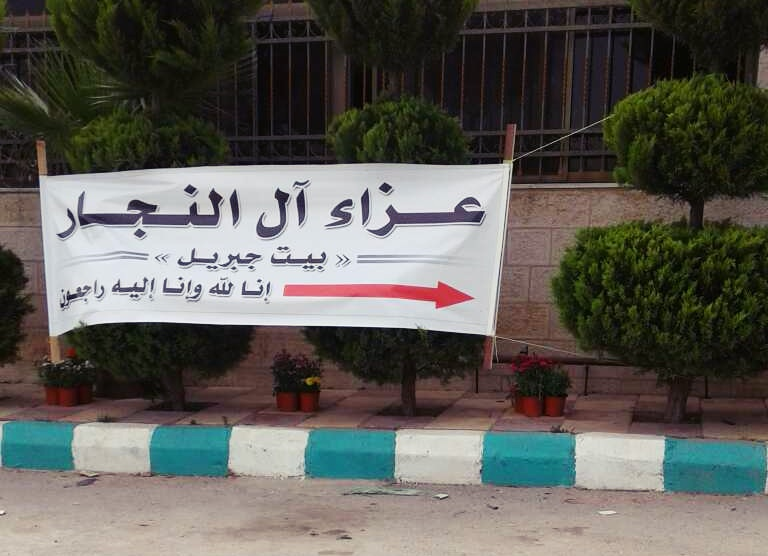
Al-Najjar family in Jordan with their origin from Bayt Jibrin

== People ==
- Abu Ayyub al-Ansari
- Umm Sulaym bint Milham
- Zayd ibn Thabit
