= Arfajah =

7th-century companion of Muhammad and military commander

Arfaja bin Harthama
- Born: about 598; Bareq, Arabia
- Died: 654; Mosul, Rashidun Caliphate
- Relatives: Banu Bariq of Azd (clan); Kahlan (tribe); Harthamah ibn Abd al-Uzza (father)
- Military career
- Allegiance: Rashidun Caliphate.
- Branch: Rashidun army
- Rank: Amir al-Jaysh (commander of Rashidun army); Amir al-Bahr (commander of Rashidun navy
- Conflicts: Battle of Mahra; Battle of Dibba; Battle of Darin; Muslim conquest of Pars; Battle of Namaraq; Battle of Kaskar; Battle of the Bridge; Battle of Buwaib; Siege of Ubulla; Conquest of Maysan governate; Battle of Qadisiyyah; Siege of Ctesiphon (637); Siege of Tikrit; Siege of Mosul; Battle of Ahvaz; Siege of Ramhormoz; Siege of Shushtar; Muslim conquest of Khuzestan; Battle of Nahāvand
- Other work: First chain Narrator of Hadith; Governor of Mosul (642–654) (twice); co-founder of Basra; Founder & Governor of Haditha; first architect of Mosul Grand Mosque

Arfajah ibn Harthama al-Bāriqī (Arabic: عرفجة بن هرثمة البارقي) (also known as Arfajah al-Bāriqī) was a companion of the Islamic prophet Muhammad. He was a member of the Azd branch of the Bariq clan that inhabited Southwestern Arabia.

Arfajah was one of the commanders of the eleven corps of armies sent by the first caliph, Abu Bakr, to quell a rebellion after Muhammad died. Arfajah was one of the first caliphate naval commanders, as Abu Bakr dispatched him with Hudaifa bin Mihsan's corps to fight opponents of Islam in Oman, as he was entrusted to lead the Azd naval forces from Bahrayn to invade Fars province in order to stop Sassanid coastal incursions. He later served as Governor of Mosul during the reign of Caliph Umar.

An energetic military general, Arfajah contributed to the Muslim conquest of Persia, as he participated in the major battles against the Sassanids such as the naval conquest of Pars, Battle of the Bridge, Battle of Buwaib, Battle of al-Qadisiyyah, Siege of Ctesiphon (637), and the Battle of Nahavand, until the Muslim conquest of Khuzestan, where he captured the city of Ahvaz. He also engaged briefly against the Byzantines during the conquest of Mosul and Tikrit.

Arfajah is remembered as a gifted administrator, with building and urbanization expertise. He played a major part in the founding of the cities of Basra and Haditha. His architectural achievements include building of the Mosul Grand Mosque (later known as the Umayyad Mosque). Arfajah was the first of the Rashidun caliphate who implemented Amsar, an Islamic permanent garrison fortress with Caravanserai.

== Biography ==
According to Ibn Hazm, his full Nisba lineage was Arfaja b. Harthama b. Abd-al-Uzza b. Zuhayr b. Thailbh b. Amr b. Sa`d b. Thailbh b. Kinanah al-Bariqi; the Bariq were descendants of Al-Azd.

According to Ahmad Jawdat Pasha, who quoted Waqidi, Arfajah grew up in a wealthy family and was known as a gifted orator. Arfajah also had powerful martial prowess as he is said to have been skilled in sword-fighting and equestrian methods, while also possessing good social skills.

Arfajah is accounted a companion of Muhammad, as he met Muhammad. Umar ibn al Khattab attested that Arfajah had met Muhammad at least once and professed Islam during Muhammad's lifetime. Arfajah narrated a Hadith directly from Muhammad.

=== Ridda Wars ===
In 633, Abu Bakr dispatched Arfaja bin Harthama and Hudhayfah al-Bariqi to Mahra following the orders of Abu Bakr, then sent Ikrimah to march and join Arfajah. As Arfaja had not yet arrived, Ikrimah, instead of waiting for him, tackled the local rebels on his own. At Jairut, Ikrimah met two rebel armies preparing for battle. He persuaded the weaker to embrace Islam and then joined up with them to defeat their opponents. Then the event following was Arfajah and the caliphate armies continued their march to fight the remnants of Mahranite rebels in violent battles against the Mahranite rebels until they pacified the entire Mahra region.

Having re-established Islam in Mahra, Ikrimah moved his corps to Abyan, where he rested his men and awaited further developments. Until further instruction arrived for Arfaja and his Azd army to assist the Al Azdi Ruler, Abd Al-Juland and his brother Jayfar, who ruled the interior of the Oman peninsula and travelled to Medina in 632 to swear fealty to the Caliph Abu Bakr, who received him with pleasure. The leader of the apostates of Oman was Laqit bin Malik Al-Azdi, known as "the one with the crown", or Dhu'l Taj. A natural rival to the Julanda kings, he forced them into retreat before the army from Medina completed its arduous journey through the Rub' al Khali to reach the Oman peninsula. Meeting up with the Madinan army, the forces of the Julanda were bolstered by tribes from the region who deserted Laqit. Then the Omanite and Azd allied army in turn attacked the Sasanian governor Maskan and defeated Maskan's forces at Damsetjerd in Sohar, killing Maskan. Leaving behind all their silver and gold, the Sasanians evacuated the country. The allied forces of Arfajah and the Julandi brothers fought the rebels under Laqit in the final engagement of the Battle of Dibba, where the rebel leader placed his men's families behind their lines in order to encourage them to fight harder. However, the Medinan army prevailed following the arrival of reinforcements, the Beni Abdul Kais and Beni Najia tribes who had formed part of the Caliph's army but who had been delayed during the long journey from Medina. After the rebellion of Laqit was put down, Hudhayfah ibn Muhsin stayed in the area to consolidate the place, while Ikrimah commenced mop-up operations against remnants of rebels left in Mahra, and Arfajah was tasked to escort the spoils of war brought to the Caliphate citadel in Medina.

It is said by Yaqut al-Hamawi that in the aftermath of this conflict Arfajah found and brought a boy named Al-Muhallab ibn Abi Sufra, a future famous anti-Kharijites general, to Medina.

=== Conquest against Persia ===
==== First naval campaign ====
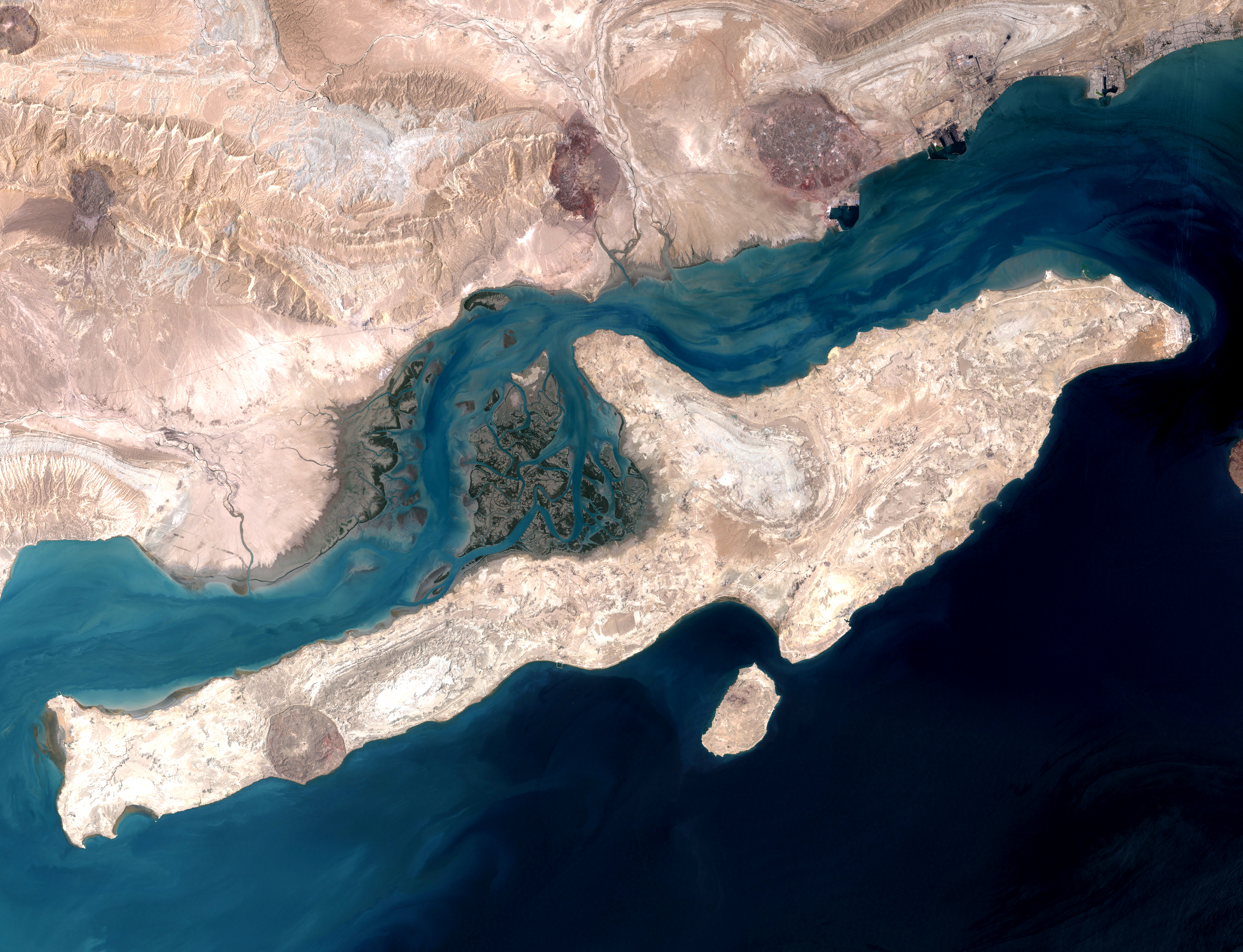
Qeshm Island that Arfajah conquered from the coast of Oman.

In the year 12 AH, Arfajah led the first Arab-Islamic naval invasions in history, and conquered a large number of islands in the Gulf of Oman. Ahmed Jawdat Pasha, who narrated from the text of Al-Waqidi, pointed that Arfajah did not have trouble to raise an army and ships which needed to mount this naval invasion without the support of central caliphate, due to his notably wealthiness and powerful influence of followers from within his clan. Ahmed Jawdat further narrated that the background of Arfajah naval expedition from Al-Waqidi's book that Arfajah were filled by impetuous Jihad spirit And he disregarded the advice of Al-Faruq, boarded the ships and marched for the conquest in the Sea of Oman. However, Jawdat mistook as he though this campaign occurred during Umar caliphate, while in reality it is occurred during caliphate of Abu Bakr. Tabari narrated that as caliph Abu Bakar learned Arfajah acted without his consent, he immediately dismissed Arfajah.

==== Campaign under Muthanna ====
As Khalid ibn al-Walid transferred to Levant, Arfajah marched to rendezvous with the army under al-Muthanna ibn Haritha, who are now being in charge of Rashidun forces in Iraq, and served under him in the victorious Battle of Namaraq and the Battle of Kaskar. However the Muthanna and Arfaja experienced major drawback in the Battle of the Bridge, where they suffered heavy losses. responded to this calamity, caliph Umar reacted to send the contingent of Bajila tribe under the leadership of Jarir ibn Abdullah al-Bajali for reinforcement. although there is some minor quarrel between Jarir and Arfajah, in the end they are agree to joint their forces under Muthanna to fight the Persians. then Arfajah and Muthanna, have been replenished by Bajila host of Jarir, marched toward Buwaib, where they fought the Sassanid again, in the victorious Battle of Buwaib, where they even succeeded slaying the Sassanid general, Mihran. which also called by Tabari and Ali ibn al-Athir as "day of tenth" (Yawm al-Ashir), due to the intensity of the battle where each one of Muslim soldiers managed to kill ten of Sassanid soldier. After the battle, Arfajah march to Hirah, and recapture the city, which has been fallen to the Sassanid before after the Battle of the Bridge.

Later, in the year 12 AH, Bahrain were suffered from constant naval raids by Persians. Arfajah, who just conquered the town of Sawad immediately goes to Bahrain to reinforce his superior in Bahrain, al-Ala al Hadrami.

==== Second naval campaign ====
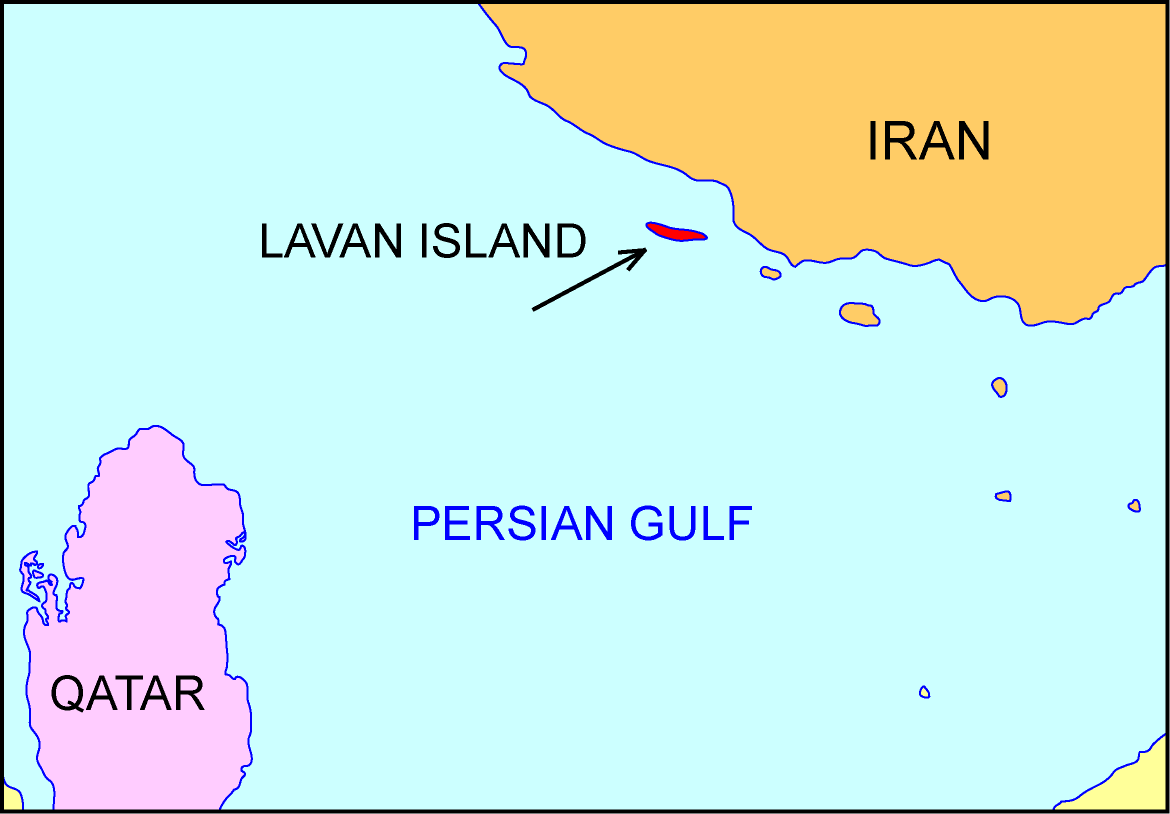
Lavan Island

In the end of the year 13 AH, al Ala ibn Hadrami commanded Arfajah started sending ships and boats for further maritime expedition, as they are ordered by caliph Umar to detach himself from Al-Muthanna ibn Haritha while they are in Hirah. This time, Arfajah, under al Ala, were attacking the island of Darin (Qatif) to exterminate the fleeing apostate rebels who flee from mainland of Arabian peninsula toward that island. the Muslim armies began attacking the capital of Darin and killing the rebels there, pacified the eastern Arab coasts. Then, on their own initiative, Arfajah, under instruction from al Ala, started to send ships towards Sassanid coast in Tarout Island. This continued until Arfajah reached the port of Borazjan, where according to Ibn Sa'd Arfajah sunk many Persian navy ships in a battle, Shuaib Al Arna'ut and al-Arqsoussi recorded the words of Al-Dhahabi regarding Arfaja naval campaign during this occasion: "...Arfaja sent to the coast of Persia, destroying many(enemy) ships, and conquered the island and build mosque". It is said by historians this Arfajah operations in the coast of Persian Gulf secured the water ways for Muslims army and paving the way for the later Muslim conquest of Pars. Ibn Balkhi wrote that Arfajah write his progress to al Ala, who in turn inform to 'Umar. This satisfy 'Umar, who in turn instructed al Ala to further resupply Arfajah who still continued fighting off coast, which Arfajah responds continued the naval campaigns the mainland of Fars. The coastal incursions commenced by Arfajah spans from Jazireh-ye Shif to an Island, which identified by Ahmad ibn Mājid as Lavan Island Then continued to until they reached Kharg Island. Poursharianti recorded this second Arfajah naval adventure were ended with the annexation of Kharg, in month of Safar, 14 AH.

I have provided you with Arfajah ibn Harthamah, and he is a Mujahid and brilliant strategist, so if he comes to you, ask his consultation and keep him near (to you)".

Caliph Umar praise Arfajah in his letter to Utbah ibn Ghazwan.

However, this time caliph 'Umar disliked Arfajah unnecessarily dragged sea adventures, as the naval forces of Arfajah were originally dispatched to support Utbah ibn Ghazwan to conquer Ubulla. Shortly, 'Umar instructed to dismiss Arfajah from his command and reassign al-Ala ibn Hadrami as his replacement. although, Donnes said in his version that al-Ala died before he could assume the position. Nevertheless, the caliph then later instructed Arfajah to bring 700 soldiers from Bahrain to immediately reinforce Utbah who is marching towards Al-Ubulla. Arfajah manage to rendezvous with Utbah later in the location that will become a Basra city, and together they besiege Ubulla until they managed to capture the port city. Abu Mikhnaf reported in Ali Ibn Athir book, al Kamal, that the conquest of Ubulla by Arfajah and Utbah were bloodless, as the Sassanid garrison somehow terrified by the besiegers so they gave up fighting and leave Ubulla undefended, allowing Utbah and Arfajah to capture it. Then after they take Ubulla and used it as headquarters, Utbah and Arfajah commence operation in south-eastern Iraq, and capturing Maysan Governorate.

Later, Arfajah also witnessed the Battle of al-Qadisiyyah under Sa'd ibn Abi Waqqas. Arfajah marched from Basra to Join Sa'd before the battle, while also brought 400 to 700 Azd cavalry under him, which he brought earlier in the conquest of Ubulla. Arfajah then placed under the banner of al Mughira ibn Shu'bah, whose company in total were about 1,500–1,800 soldiers. As the Muslims has emerged victorious from the hard battle in Qadisiyah, they immediately marched towards the Sassanid capital, which are nicknamed by the Arabs as Al-Mada'in. Sa'd lead the Muslim army to cross the river and engaged in the besiege the capital, until Yazdegerd III fled and the capital fallen to the Muslims. Sa'd and his army, including Arfajah stay for while in the conquered capital of Sassanid and manage to establish base there.

==== First Mosul governance ====
Later, at the month of Safar in the year 16 A.H., the supreme commander of eastern theater, Sa'd ibn abi Waqqas, was informed that the people of Mosul had gathered in Tikrit with a man from the Byzantine called Al-Antiqa. Sa'd then wrote to Umar regarding the issue of the people of Mosul who had gathered in Tikrit with Al-Antiqa. The caliph ordered him to take initiative, then Sa'd appoint Abdullah ibn Al-Mu'tam as the commander of the operation. Abdullah ibn Mu'tam arranged the formation in manner that he appoint Rabi'i bin Al-Afkal as vanguard, Al-Harith ibn Hassan on the right wing, Furat ibn Hayyan on the left wing, while Hani ibn Qais, and Arfajah bin Harthama on the cavalry. The Rashidun cavalry which led by Arfajah were the first to arrive in Tikrit, where they facing the Byzantine army allied with Iyad and Taghlib ibn Wa'il tribe. After they finished with Tikrit, Ibn al-Mu'ta'm sent Rabi'i ibn al-Afkal and Arfajah to subdue Nineveh and Mosul, before the news about Byzantine under Antiqa defeat in Tikrit spreading wide. then both Arfajah and Ibn al Mu'ta'm succeeded to force surrender from both city and subject both to Jizya tribute.

However, regarding Mosul there is conflicting reports that Khalifah ibn Khayyat recorded the one who subdue Mosul was instead Iyad ibn Ghanm, governor of Jazira, as Jazira were adjacent to Mosul. The alternative explanation were offered by Baladhuri who giving a reconcilliary explanation that Arfajah were indeed the first conqueror of Mosul, while Mosul rebelled sometimes later, which then recaptured for the second time now by Iyad ibn Ghanm. However, Baladhuri admit that his version were narrated through unreliable chains.

Due to instruction from caliph Umar, Arfaja Al-Bariqi set up a garrison (Amsar) in Mosul, and was appointed Wali (governor) there, particularly managing the revenue. The area of Mosul was very sparsely populated when it was conquered by the Muslims. During the reign of Umar, the Muslim army found it a suitable place to construct a base. Later, when the area was settled and a mosque was erected, Umar ordered the resettlement of the 4000 settlers to Mosul. The new buildings were constructed from mud bricks, instead of reeds, a material that was popular in the region and other already populated areas were greatly expanded. At Mosul, Harthama, at the command of Umar, constructed a fort, few churches, a mosque and a locality for the Jewish population. He used it as his headquarters for the northern military operations. Utba consolidated his position in Tikrit and later advanced to Bajurmi and Shahrazour where his troops settled there. At Mosul Arfaja at the command of Umar, constructed a fort, few churches, a mosque and a locality for the Jewish population. Until this moment, Ibn Khaldun has remarked the rivalry between Arfajah with Jarir ibn Abdullah al-Bajali over leadership of the Bajila tribe army.

==== Founding Basra ====
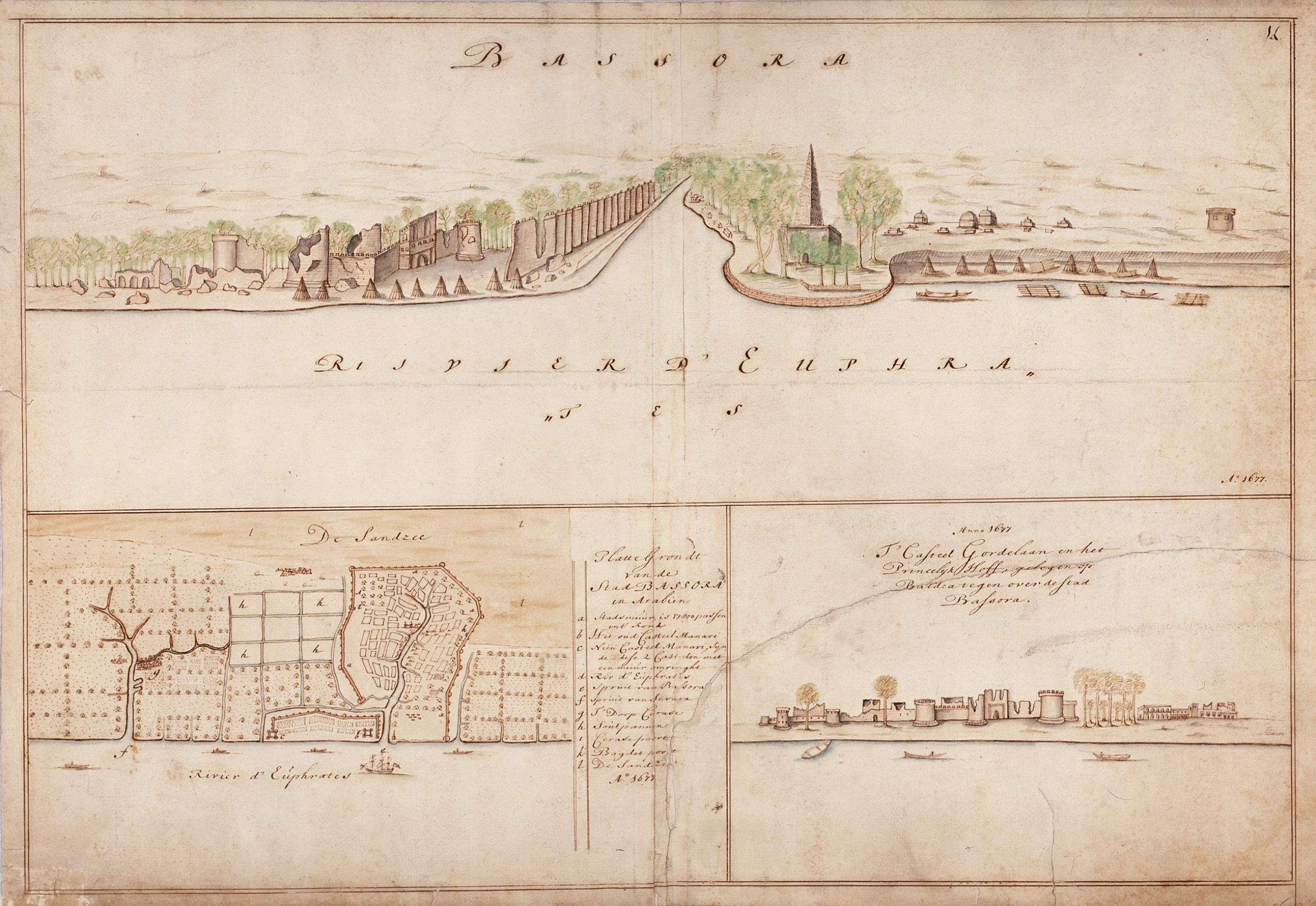
View of Basra in circa 1695, by Dutch cartographer Isaak de Graaf

After a short tenure of his governance, Arfajah instructed by caliph Umar to march with his 700 Azd soldiers to march towards the location which will be known in the future as Basra, while delegate the governance of Mosul to al Harith ibn Hassan. Arfajah and Utbah then founded the Amsar(garrison city) which named as Basra, where the military encampment in the location gradually supported with further permanent structures and growing into large settlement, as Arfajah instructed his soldiers to construct seven tribal complexes which can fit the 700 garrison troops. Then Arfajah instructed to build houses of mud bricks, plaster and mud to replace the camps. As the buildings stands, Arfajah and other army leaders such as Mujaz'ah ibn Thawr as-Sadusi, and Arfajah fellow tribesmen, Hudhayfah ibn Muhsin, started to fill the complex with tribes of Azd, Tamim, and tribe of Sadus ibn Shayban.

Arfajah then designed seven dams of adobe in Basra, two in the settlement of Al-Khuraybah, one in az-Zabuqah, two in Banu Tamim, and the last two in al-Azd tribe settlement

==== Assisting al Ala al Hadrami in Fars ====
In 17 AH, al Ala commencing a naval operation towards Fars without permission from the caliph. However, the three forces sent by al Ala were beaten badly by the Sassanids and stranded overseas as their ships and boats were burned by the Sassanids. Some of the ships managed to arrive into mainlands of Arabia and informed al Ala, who in turn asking for assistance from the caliph. 'Umar responded in the month of Shaban of 17 AH, Umar wrote to Utbah to mobilize army forces to assist Al-Ala Al-Hadrami to the province of Persia and set sail by sea.

In response, Utbah sent an army of 12,000 fighters, which led by Asim ibn Amr al-Tamimi, Arfajah bin Harthama, Ahnaf ibn Qais, and Abu Sabrah bin Abi Rahm. In this rescue operation, Arfajah advising Utbah a strategy to send the forces of Abu Sabrah alone to the coastal area, in order to bait the Sassanid forces while hiding their main forces beyond the sight of the enemy and even the isolated Muslim forces that they intend to rescue. Then as Sassanid army saw Abu Sabrah came with only few soldiers, they immediately gave chase as they though it is the whole Muslim reinforcement soldiers. At this certain moment, Utbah commence Arfajah final plan to commit his main forces to flank the unexpected Sassanid force, causing heavy casualties on them and routing them, thus this operation of relieving al Ala Hadrami mariners which had been posed to the danger of being isolated in the Persian soil succeeded.

Then as Utbah marched his army to return to Basra, he himself died while performing Hajj in 17 AH during the month of Dhu al-Hijjah. Arfajah now acted as the administrator of Basra as Utbah had died.

==== Conquest of Khuzestan ====
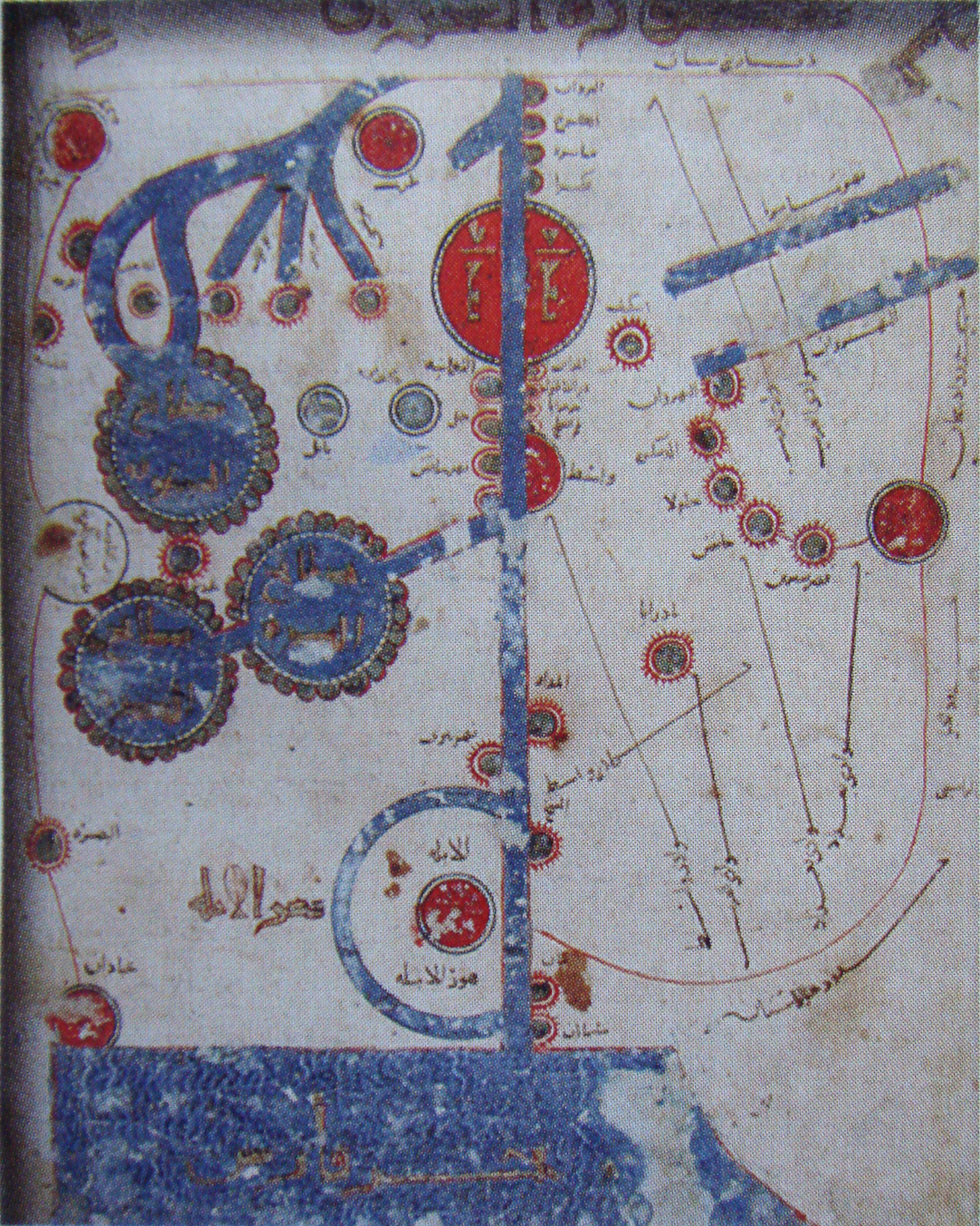
Khuzestan map of al-Istakhri, Abbasid geographer

After the Muslims landed in Basra in Dhul-Hijjah in the year 16 AH, the Islamic army was subjected to Persian raids led by Hormuzan from the city of Ahvaz which bordering Basra. Before his natural death, Utbah send an army which commanded by Arfajah, Hudhaifah bin Muhsin, Mujaza bin Thawr, Husayn ibn Al Qa'qa, Ashim ibn Amr, and Salma ibn Al Qain, who lead in 700 soldiers each. These Basra contingents were further reinforced by garrison of Kufa, governed by Sa'd ibn Abi Waqqas, before the battle against Hormuzan. Before they engage Hormuzan, Arfajah and the Muslim armies marches to the vicinity of the area, to subdue several places including Kashkar, to cut off supply route and reinforcements for the Sassanids in Ahvaz. Arfajah managed to defeat the Hormuzan in this battle and the latter sued for peace.

In 18 AH, Arfajah began to the conquest of Khuzestan, as they then marching towards Ramhormoz. Arfajah marched on with Al-Bara' ibn Malik, Majza' bin Thawr, and reinforcements from Kufah led by Abu Sabrah ibn Abi Rahm, until they rendezvous with the forces from Kufa led by Al-Nu'man ibn Muqrin and merged their forces to face Hormuzan. Then they later defeated Hormuzan, who led the Sassanid resistance before in Ahvaz. Hormuzan then flee from Ramhormoz and escape towards Shushtar, which then chased by the Muslim armies that ended in the lengthy Siege of Shushtar, which is where Hormuzan finally taken captive.

After the Siege of Shushtar, Arfajah continued to press deeper of Khuzestan with Abu Musa al-Ash'ari and Al-Nu'man ibn Muqrin capturing Shush, until Arfajah arrived in the great Battle of Nahavand, which result sealed the fate of Sassanid forever as more than 100,000 Sassanid soldiers killed in this battle alone,

=== Second Mosul governance ===
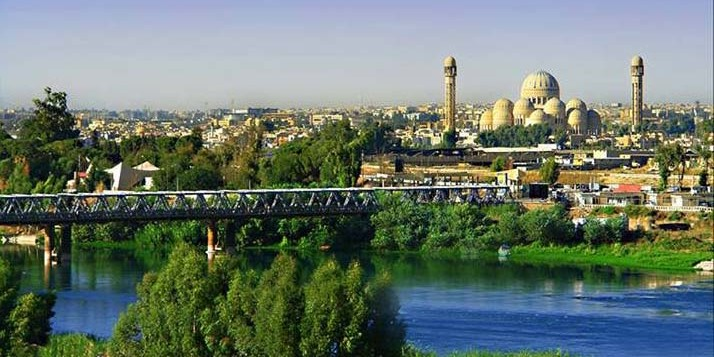
Grand mosque of Mosul.

Arfajah showing his energy after he was appointed for the second time as governor of Mosul, as he built four new districts of Arab Muslim soldiers and their families in both in Mosul, In addition, Arfajah arranged fortifications in frontiers delegated soldiers and men to them to protect the borders of the caliphate territory.

In year 25 AH, Arfajah choose a small village near Nineveh in the eastern bank of Tigris to build a new garrison city, which later known as city of Haditha Mosul(new Mosul), that in the future will be simply known as city of Haditha. These garrison cities under Arfajah became main headquarters and supply route for the army that were sent to Muslim conquest of Armenia and Muslim conquest of Azerbaijan.

Later, in year 26 AH, as the caliphate under Uthman ibn al-Affan annexed the city Erbil, Arfajah handled the affair with Kurds inhabitants in the city, by facilitating dialogues with them, started to build a Mosque and tasking the Quran to be promoted in the city. While also setting up armed forces in this area to control security and Kharaj revenue.

In the year 29 AH the next wave of Arab Muslim settlers arrived in Iraq under the leadership of Abdallah ibn Amir, the governor of Basra at that time. This forces were instructed by caliph Uthman to initiate the Muslim conquest of Sistan and Muslim conquest of Khorasan. Thus to assist their conquest, Arfajah sent out settler contingents numbered 4,000 soldiers came from the tribe of Azd, Kindah, Tayy, and Abdul Qays. Then, as those soldiers returned to Mosul after the conquest, Arfajah host these soldiers his jurisdiction cities of Mosul and Haditha, while sent them to commence routine raids against remaining Sassanid elements, while maintain Ribat military patrols on the borders.

For the rest of Arfajah tenure in Mosul, Mosul became one of the most important city in Iraq that were immediately filled by immigrant Arab soldiers, and non-Arab Arameans and Persians, who also poured into the city in large numbers, as the settlements within Arfajah jurisdictions was growing and extended between the borders of Euphrates Region in the north towards Kufa in the south. Thus, it became one of the fastest growing urban, administrative and economic centers in Caliphate.

Arfajah ruled Mosul until his death in 34 AH/654 AD

== Legacy ==
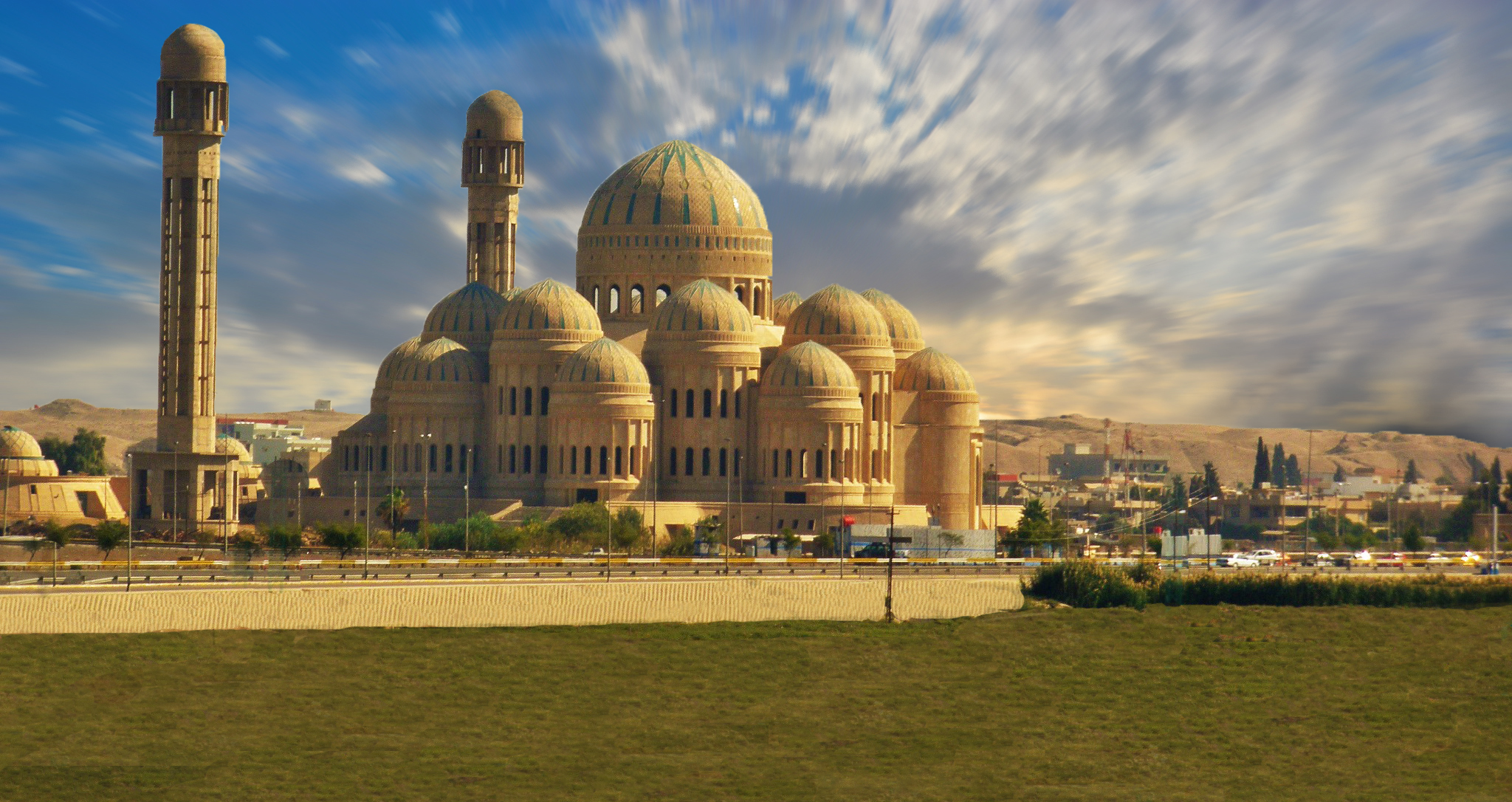
Great mosque (Masjid Jami) of Mosul which designed by Arfajah.

Mahmoud Sheet Khattab viewed that Arfajah were underrated hero who only gained small attention in history, despite the fact he was the first Muslim Arab leader who lead the battle on the sea. however, his contribution for Islamic naval history were doubtless, as Mahmoud further remarked that naval warfare before Arfajah were still uncommon concept for majority of Arabs. Mahmoud also spots another underrated attention toward Arfajah for his part for the overall conquest of Persia, where he gained small attention, despite Arfajah, by any means, has marked huge contributions for it.

Ibn al-Kalbi said that Arfajah were the first who built Amsar, or Islamic fortess garrison with Caravanserai feature, that accommodated the settlements of Muslim soldiers in the annexed territories permanently and also setting up the public facilities and Mosques in said Amsar.

Arfajah also known being the first architect of the great Umayyad mosque of Mosul, which later further expanded and rebuilt by Marwan ibn Muhammad during the era of Umayyad Caliphate. In modern era, Nineveh Governorate municipality announced on 18 February 2019 that reconstruction of the mosque was resumed, albeit damages caused by ISIS, with a 50 million dollar grant from the United Arab Emirates. Completion date was not set.

Moreover, Mahmud Abdul Qadir al-Bamatraf, a Yemeni historian, consider Arfajah as pioneer of Arabization and Islamization in Mosul.

=== Hurqus & Iraqi Kharijites ===
It is said that Hurqus ibn Zuhayr as-Sa'di, more famously known as Dhu al-Khuwaysirah at-Tamimi, a Tamim tribe chieftain, first generation Kharijites and veteran of the Battle of Hunayn participated among the Arab settler hosts brought by Arfajah during Conquest of Khuzestan, Hurqus participation recorded particularly when he was sent by Rashidun army superiors to defeat Hormuzan in 638 at Ahvaz (known as Hormizd-Ardashir in modern era), and forced the city to pay jizya (poll-tax).

Hurqus were known to protested against Muhammad policy during Hunayn, and being prophesied by the latter that he will revolting against Caliphate later. During the reign of Uthman, long time after Arfajah died, Hurqus was one of the ringleaders from Basra that conspired to assassinate Uthman. During the Caliphate of Ali, Hurqus were among those who fight him in the Battle of Nahrawan. Despite being suppressed by Ali, remnants of Hurqus hosts of Kharijites survived and would later influenced the splinter sects of Azariqa, Sufriyyah, and the Najdat radical sects that will plagued the entire history of Rashidun Caliphate, Umayyad, and Abbasid with endemic rebellions.

Another troublesome Kharijite embryos that also came to Iraq under Arfajah were the ones that hail from Bajila tribe, Arfajah had many problems in his rule with this tribe, that according to Sayf ibn Umar, Arfajah even need to place his Azd tribesmen among the Bajalis settlement to keep them in check, as the Bajalis often quarrelled and inciting problems. It is appeared that the Bajilas at first has followed Arfajah from Omani at certain point during the early phase of the Conquest of Persia, Before Arfajah abandon them after the conquest of Ubulla, and relinquish the leadership of Bajalis to Jarir ibn Abdullah al-Bajali in the instruction of Caliph Umar, who then further instructed the Bajalis to move toward Kufa. From this tribe, Abd Allah ibn Wahb al-Rasibi has rise in the era of Ali, to form the Ibāḍiyya Wahb sect, that even survived up to 20th century modern era in Oman.

The Kharijites sects, believed by most scholars of Islam started by Hurqus, were one of the most radical splinter sect in Islam that does not have qualm to slaughter and seize the wealth of other Muslims whom they view were not adherent enough to Islamic teaching, while accusing the incumbent authority with most extreme form of takfir (excommunication from Islam). The Kharijites were collectively called as Haruriyya/Haruri, as their first open rebellion against the authority in history occurred during their gathering in a village named al-Haruri.

== Appraisal ==
Mahmoud Sheet Khattab, an Iraqi minister, military commander, historian and writer (1919–1998), noted that Arfajah was fine example of the rare Arab courage, that even after the devastating defeat in the Battle of Bridge, caliph Umar continue to trust him. Mahmoud also praised Arfajah as one of the best warriors under Sa'd ibn Abi Waqqas during the Battle of al-Qadisiyyah and after Siege of Ctesiphon, as Mahmoud remarked his strong will and mentality that keep his work ethic, despite suffered setback once in the Battle of the Bridge, while also praising his innovation of naval warfare among Muslim Arabs.

Caliph Umar praise Arfajah as military strategy expert at one time and urged Utbah ibn Ghazwan, the first governor of Basra, to rely on his counsel. and indeed, Utbah known to depends heavily on Arfajah skill for the matters of both military and administration during his tenure in Iraq. 20th century Syrian jurist, Ali Al-Tantawi, in his book praised Arfajah for his decisiveness in crucial moments. While Ibn Hajar al-Asqalani in his biography remarks the charismatic leadership of Arfajah as his presence can raise the morale of his soldiers.

Aside from his military skills, Utbah were also praised for his civil administrations for his founding of city of Basra, and his administration of Mosul after the conquest, as President of Mosul University, Sa'id Al-Diwaji remarked: "...(Arfajah) Al-Barqi was a person who has a passion for organization, urbanization, urban planning, and persuade the Arabs to reside in conquered lands, especially the one like Mosul..."

Regarding his social intelligence, according to Salama ibn Muslim ibn Ibrāhīm al-ʿAwtabī, Arfajah has a good Physiognomy judgement, as he was the one who recognized the talent of the young Al-Muhallab ibn Abi Sufra, future famous Umayyad leader, despite Abdur Rahman ibn Samura dismissed the boy due to his young age.

== See also ==
- Early Caliphate navy
- Islamization of Iran
- Muslim conquests in the Indian subcontinent

== Bibliography ==
=== Sources ===
Books

- Abed, Ibrahim; Hellyer, Peter (2001). United Arab Emirates: a new perspective. London: Trident Press. pp. 81. ISBN 1900724472. OCLC 47140175.
- Abru, Hafiz (2019). Jagrāfiyā-yi Ḥāfiẓ-i Abrū. Volume 2 : Mushtamil bar jaghrāfiyā-yi tārīkhi-yi Midītirana, Armanistān, Firingistān, Jazīra, ʿIrāq, Khūzistān wa Fārs. BRILL. p. 102. ISBN 978-9004402348.
- al-Awtabi, Salamah ibn Muslim (1991). An Early Islamic Family from Oman Al-'Awtabī's Account of the Muhallabids. Vol. 1. Translated by Martin Hinds. University of Manchester. ISBN 9780951612408.
- Hawley, Donald (1970). The Trucial States. London: Allen & Unwin. p. 48. ISBN 9780049530058. OCLC 152680.
- * Bamatraf, Muhammad Abdul Qadir (1981). الجامع ، جامع شمل اعلام المهاجرين المنتسبين إلى اليمن وقبائلهم – محمد عبد القادر بامطرف. Dar ar Rasheed.
- Donner, Fred M. (2014). The Early Islamic Conquests. Princeton University Press. p. 40. ISBN 9781400847877.
- al-Hamawi, Yaqut (1995). Mu'jam al Buldan (Dictionary of Countries). Dar as Sadr.
- Ibn Ḥazm, Abū Muḥammad ʿAlī ibn Aḥmad ibn Saʿīd (2018). جمهرة أنساب العرب Vol 1. ar-lib-eshia-ir. p. 367.
- Heard-Bey, Frauke (2005). From Trucial States to United Arab Emirates : a society in transition. London: Motivate. p. 128. ISBN 1860631673. OCLC 64689681.
- Hinds, Martin (1996). Studies in early Islamic history. the University of Michigan: Darwin Press. p. 202. ISBN 9780878501090.
- Ibn Kathir, Ismail (2003). البداية والنهاية. Islamweb.
- Jabr, Hessa Abdel Rahman (2004). الحياة الاقتصادية في فارس: خلال الفترة من 232–334 هـ/846-945 م [Economic life in Persia : during the period from 232–334 AH / 846–945 AD]. King Faisal Center for Research and Islamic Studies. ISBN 9960726568.
- Jalalipour, Saeid (2014). The Arab Conquest of Persia: The Khūzistān Province before and after the Muslims Triumph (PDF). Sasanika.
- Kennedy, Hugh (2010). The Great Arab Conquests: How the Spread of Islam Changed the World We Live In. Hachette UK. ISBN 978-0297865599.
- Khattab, Mahmud Sheet (2010). دة فتح العراق والجزيرة [Leaders of the Conquest of Iraq and Al-Jazeera].
- Kurzman, Charles (2002). Modernist Islam, 1840–1940: A Sourcebook. Oxford University Press. ISBN 0199882509.
- Le Strange, Guy (2014). Fārs-nāma of Ibnu l-Balkhī. Casemate Publishers. p. 112. ISBN 9781909724679.
- al Maghlouth, Sami ibn Abdullah (2015). أطلس الفتوحات الإسلامية. العبيكان. ISBN 9789960548517.
- Muir, William (1924). Studies in History, Economics, and Public Law, Volume 68, Issue 2 Volume 68, Issue 2 of Columbia Studies in the Social Sciences, Columbia University. Faculty of Political Science Studies in History, Economics, and Public Law, Columbia University. Faculty of Political Science. Columbia University Press.
- Pourshariati, Parvaneh (2021). Decline and Fall of the Sasanian Empire The Sasanian-Parthian Confederacy and the Arab Conquest of Iran (in Arabic). Translated by Anis Abdel Khaleq Mahmoud. Arab Center for Research and Policy Studies. ISBN 978-6144453704.
- Rawi, Thabit Ismail (1970). Tārīkh al-Dawlah al-ʻArabīyyah: Khilāfat al-Rashīdin w-al-Umuwiyīn. Maṭbaʻat al-Irshād.
- Shakir, Mahmud (2005). Encyclopedia of Persian Gulf History: Part One. p. 83. ISBN 9796500011394.
- Tabari, Muhammad ibn Jarir (2021). History of al-Tabari part 2. Shia Online Library. p. 646.
- Ulrich, Brian John (2008). Constructing Al-Azd Tribal Identity and Society in the Early Islamic Centuries. the University of Wisconsin – Madison.
- Ulrich, Brian (2019). Arabs in the Early Islamic Empire Exploring Al-Azd Tribal Identity. Edinburgh University Press. ISBN 9781474436823.

Journals

- al-Rawas, Isam Ali Ahmad (1990). Early Islamic Oman (ca - 622/280-893) : a political history. Theses, Durham University (Doctoral).

Webs

- Sergani, Ragheb (2006). "موقعة الجسر". التاريخ الإسلامي دون تشويه أو تزوير.

Preceded by	Caliphate governor of Mosul; 637-?	Succeeded by
Preceded by	Caliphate governor of Mosul; 646–654	Succeeded by
Preceded by	Caliphate governor of Haditha; 646–654	Succeeded by
