= Hudhayfah al-Bariqi =

7th-century companion of Muhammad and governor of Oman

- Born: Bariq
- Died: Oman
- Military career
- Allegiance: Rashidun Caliphate
- Branch: Rashidun army
- Rank: Commander
- Conflicts: Battle of Dibba; Muslim conquest of Pars; Battle of Qadisiyyah
- Other work: Governor of Oman (632–??)

Hudhayfah Ibn Mihsan al-Bariqi (Arabic: حذيفة بن محصن البارقي), was a companion of Muhammad. He was governor of Oman during the reign of Rashidun Caliph Abu Bakr.

== Background ==
Majority of genealogist unanimously agreed in various narrations that Hudhayfah was from Azd. while the identity of Bariq clan further highlighted by Hisham ibn al-Kalbi, Al-Baladhuri, Yaqut al-Hamawi, and Ahmed Cevdet Pasha,

Only Sayf ibn Umar who deviated from majority of historians and genealogist by saying Hudhayfah ibn Muhsin were descended from Banu Tamim, an entirely different tribe from Bariqi branch. Zia al-Umari, The author of the critics against Sayf ibn Umar, noted that aside from contradiction from majority, Sayf were generally viewed as unreliable by most historians.

== Ridda wars ==
In mid-September 632, Abu Bakr dispatched Hudhayfah Ibn Mihsan's corps to Oman to tackle the apostasy in Oman, where the tribe of Azd, that dominated the region of Oman, had revolted under their chief Laqeet bin Malik, known more commonly as "Dhu'l-Taj", i.e. "the Crowned One." According to some reports, he also claimed prophethood. Hudaifa entered the province of Oman, but not having strong enough forces to fight Dhu'l-Taj, he decided to wait for reinforcement, and wrote to the Caliph accordingly. The Caliph sent Ikrimah to aid him in late September 632. Ikrimah marched from Yamamah to Oman, and the combined forces of these two generals defeated Dhu'l-Taj at the Battle of Dibba, fought in late November 632 at Dibba, a stronghold of Dhu'l-Taj. Dhu'l-Taj was killed in battle. Being appointed governor of Oman, Hudhayfah next set about the re-establishment of law and order. Ikrimah, having no local administrative responsibility, used his corps to subdue the neighbourhood of Daba, and in a number of small actions succeeded in breaking the resistance of those of the Azd who had continued to defy the authority of Medina.

== Conquest of Persia ==
Later, Hudhayfah appeared again during the Muslim conquest of Iraq, which is during the founding of Basra, after Arfajah and Utbah ibn Ghazwan managed to conquer Lavan Island, Jazireh-ye Shif, Kharg Island. and al-Ubulla. Then Hudhayfah, Arfajah, and a chief of Sadus ibn Shayban clan named Mujaz'ah ibn Thawr as-Sadusi, started to fill the complex with their tribes and clansmen, Along with Banu Tamim tribe.

Then as the conquest goes on, in 17 AH, Hudhayfah were sent by his superior, Utbah, along with Arfajah, Asim ibn Amr al-Tamimi, Ahnaf ibn Qais, and Abu Sabrah bin Abi Rahm. to rescue caliphate soldiers that being surrounded by Sassanid Army in Fars province. this rescue operation, Arfajah advising Utbah a strategy to send the forces of Abu Sabrah alone to the coastal area, in order to bait the Sassanid forces while hiding their main forces beyond the sight of the enemy and even the isolated Muslim forces that they intend to rescue. Then as Sassanid army saw Abu Sabrah came with only few soldiers, they immediately gave chase as they though it is the whole Muslim reinforcement soldiers. At this certain moment, Utbah commence Arfajah final plan to commit his main forces to flank the unexpected Sassanid force, causing heavy casualties on them and routing them, thus this operation of relieving al Ala Hadrami mariners which has been posed to danger of being isolated in the Persian soil were succeeded.

== Bibliography ==
- Pourshariati, Parvaneh (2021). Decline and Fall of the Sasanian Empire The Sasanian-Parthian Confederacy and the Arab Conquest of Iran (in Arabic). Translated by Anis Abdel Khaleq Mahmoud. Arab Center for Research and Policy Studies. ISBN 978-6144453704.
