= Al Muhtarqah =

Village in the UAE

Al Muhtarqah المحترقة (Arabic) Al Mihtarqah
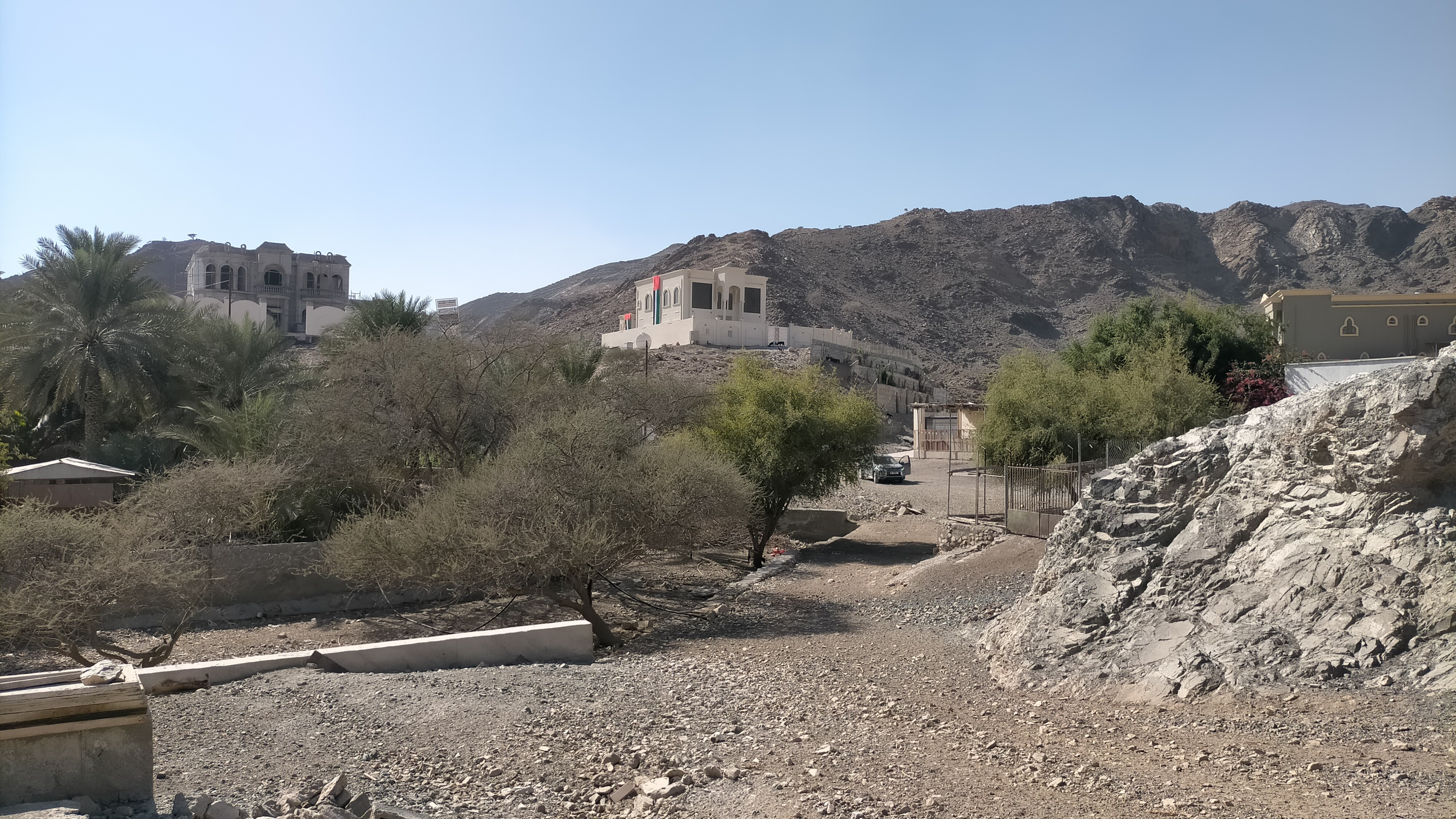
- Old and new constructions

- Location of Al Muhtarqah in the UAE Al Muhtarqah (Persian Gulf) Al Muhtarqah (Middle East) Al Muhtarqah (West and Central Asia)
- Coordinates: 25°32′28″N 56°07′50″E
- Country: United Arab Emirates
- Emirate: Fujairah

Area
  - Total: 0.33 km^{2} (0.13 sq mi)
- Elevation: 300 m (980 ft)
- Time zone: UTC+04:00

Al Muhtarqah or Al Mihtarqah (Arabic: المحترقة) is a small agricultural and livestock town in the Emirate of Fujairah, northeastern U.A.E.

== Toponymy ==
Alternative names: Al Muḥtarqah (ٱلْمُحْتَرْقَة), Mahtarraqah, Muhtarqah, Mukhtaraja, Al Mihtarqah, Al Mihtaraqah, Muhtarraqah, Al Mihtirqah, Al Muhtarqah, Mukhtaraqah.

The name of Al Muhtarqah (spelled Mukhtaraqah), its wadis, mountains and nearby towns, were recorded in the documentation and maps produced between 1950 and 1960 by the British Arabist, cartographer, military officer and diplomat Julian F. Walker, during the work carried out to establish the borders between the then so-called Trucial States, later completed by the UK Ministry of Defence, with 1:100,000 scale maps published from 1971 onwards.

In the National Atlas of the United Arab Emirates it appears as Al Miḥtarqah (Arabic: المحترقة).

== Geography ==
The village is located near the sources of the Wadi Al Fay. It lies on the drainage divide, which separates the wadis that drain their waters into the Gulf of Oman, and those that drain into the Persian Gulf.

Adjacent to the village of Al Muhtarqah is the mountain pass of Al Qaliddi (Aqabat al Qaliddi), an important crossing for caravans that followed the historic Qaliddi route, which connected the city of Ras Al Khaimah and other towns on the coast of the Persian Gulf to the city of Dibba on the coast of the Gulf of Oman, making it a strategic reference and supply point.

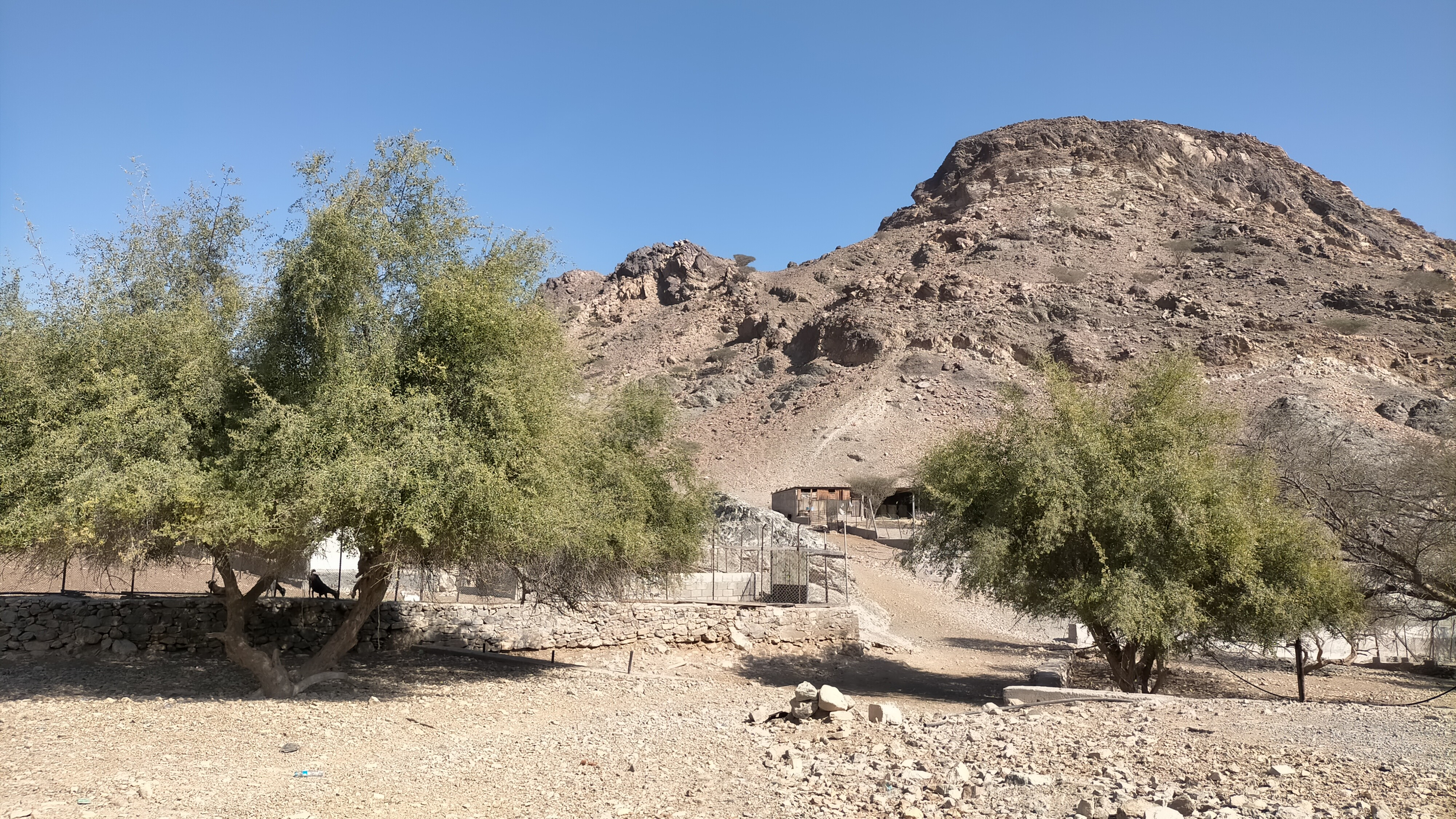
Agricultural and livestock tradition

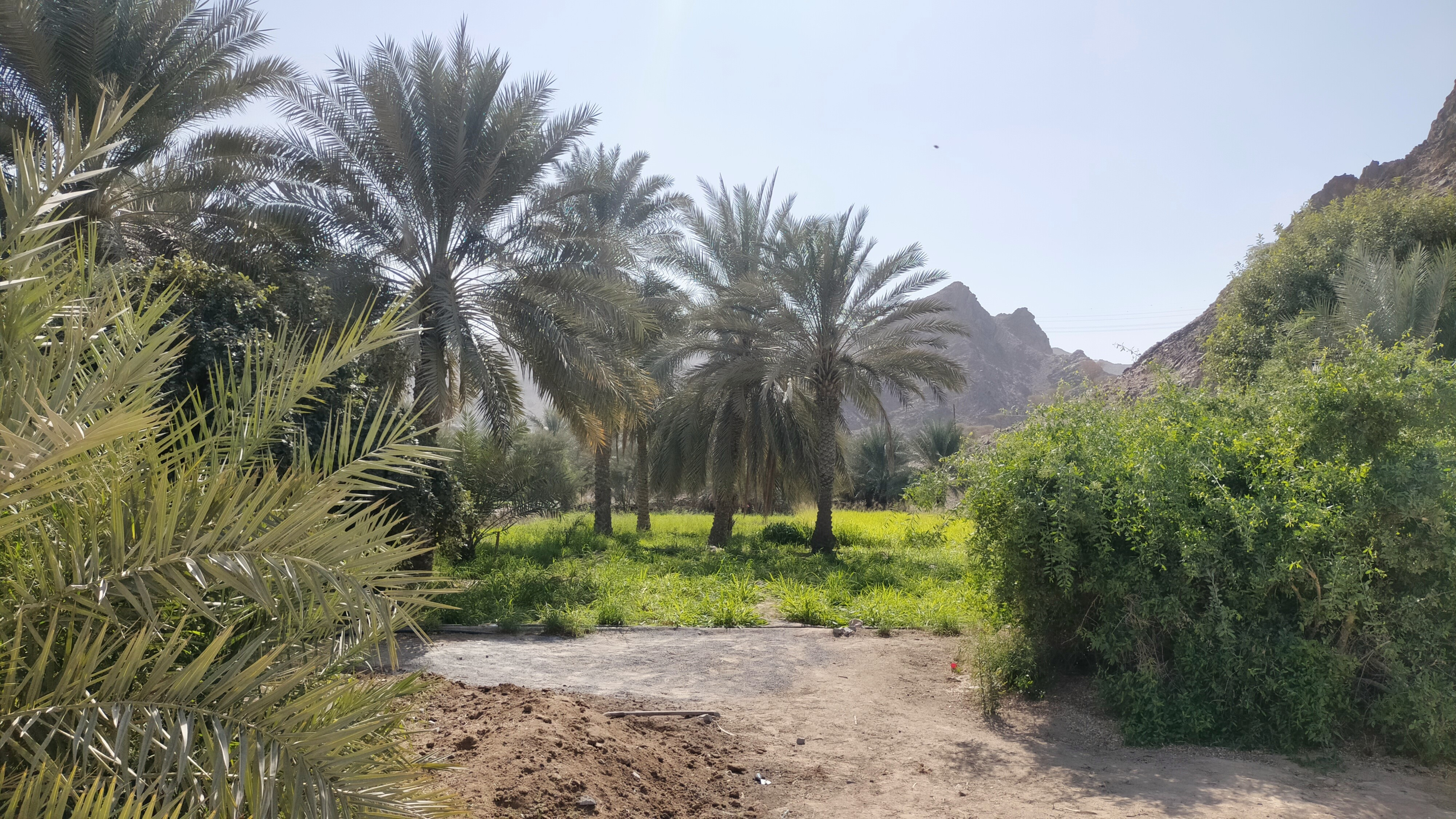
Palm groves and cultivation areas

== History ==
Historically, Al Muhtarqah relied on agriculture, animal husbandry, and honey collection, due to the abundance of wild beehives in the caves of the surrounding mountains. The region was, and still is, known for its numerous palm and fruit tree plantations, as well as its crops of wheat, millet, barley, corn, sorghum, and tobacco. Firewood was also collected and charcoal was produced.

Today, many former inhabitants of the Al Muhtarqah area have moved their permanent homes to the outskirts of Tawiyean (Arabic: الطويين, romanized: Aṭ-Ṭawyīn), but some old farms have been transformed into second homes, mainly occupied by younger generations wishing to maintain their roots and preserve their family heritage and ancestral traditions.

== Population ==
The area around Al Miḥtarqah / Al Muhtarqah was populated mainly by the Sharqiyin tribe, a tribal section of Jamāmaḩah.

Archaeological remains in the vicinity of Al Muhtarqah and Wadi Al Fay indicate human presence in this area from very early times.

== See also ==
- Eastern Arabia
  - List of wadis of the United Arab Emirates
  - List of mountains in the United Arab Emirates
  - List of wadis of Oman
  - List of mountains in Oman
