= Battle of Dibba =

632–34 battle of the Ridda Wars of the Rashidun Caliphate

- Part of Ridda Wars
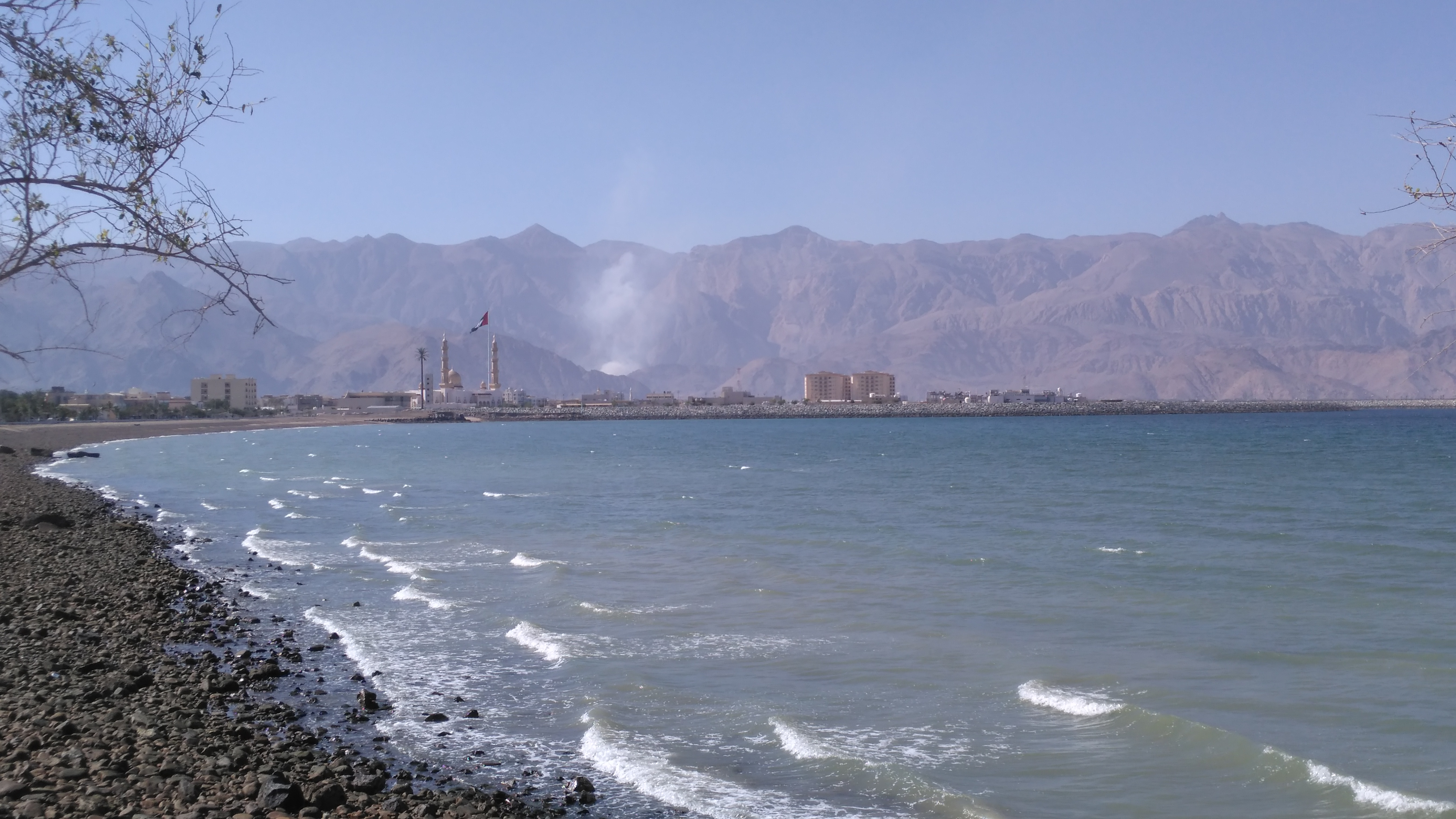
- Dibba, United Arab Emirates
| Date | 632–634 CE |
| Location | Dibba, Rashidun Caliphate (modern-day Dibba, United Arab Emirates) |
| Result | Rashidun Caliphate victory |

Belligerents
| Apostate Azdis; Anti-Julanda Tribes | Rashidun Caliphate; Pro-Caliphate Azdis; Banu al-Julanda; Pro-Julanda Tribes; Qays |

Commanders and leaders
| Laqit ibn Malik al-Azdi † | Hudhayfah al-Bariqi; Arfajah ibn Harthama; Ikrima ibn Amr |

Casualties and losses
| 10,000 killed | Unknown |

The Battle of Dibba took place between 632–634 CE during the Ridda Wars and is associated with the deaths of 10,000 men on the plain inland of the coastal town of Dibba, in what is now the United Arab Emirates (UAE). The graves of the fallen can still be seen in the area.

== Background ==
When the Persian Sasanian Empire waned, the Azd tribe became a major political force in the Oman peninsula. The Islamic prophet Muhammad sent a messenger, Amr ibn al-As, who passed through Al-Buraimi and presented his letter to the Sasanian governor, who rejected Muhammad's message. Upon the governor's rejection of the message, Amr continued onward to Nizwa to present it to the local Azdi rulers, the brothers Abd al-Juland and Jayfar, who governed the interior of the peninsula. The brothers convened the elders of the Azd tribe, who collectively agreed to convert to Islam.

In 630 CE, the Azd allied with the Julanda dynasty and attacked the Sasanian governor, Maskan, defeating his forces at Damsetjerd in Sohar and killing him. Leaving behind all their silver and gold, the overwhelmed Sasanians were expelled from the country. Upon Muhammad's death in 632, Abd travelled to Medina to swear fealty to the Caliph Abu Bakr, who received him warmly.

== Uprisings ==
A series of uprisings took place across Arabia, the suppression of which became known as the Ridda Wars, with a series of commanders dispatched to put down the rebellions. Abu Bakr sent two commanders to Oman, Hudhayfa bin Mihsan al-Bariqi, a Yemeni Himyarite and Arfajah al-Bariqi, an Azdi. These were to support the Julanda kings against any dissident Azdis.

The leader of the apostates of Oman was Laqit ibn Malik al-Azdi, known as 'the one with the crown', or Dhu'l Taj. A natural rival to the Julanda kings, he forced them into retreat before the army from Medina completed its arduous journey through the Rub al-Khali to reach the Oman peninsula. Meeting up with the Madinan army, the forces of the Julanda were bolstered by tribes from the region who deserted Laqit.

An important market town and port, Dibba sustained a busy trade with the Indies and Far East, landing goods from Alexandria and Rome as well as other markets as far afield as China. It was wealthy and arguably influential – Laqit bin Malik was a leader backed by considerable resources.

== Battle ==
The combined force then marched on Dibba, then described as 'a great market and town'. Laqit found early success in the ensuing battle, placing his men's families behind their lines in order to encourage them to fight harder. However, the Medinan army prevailed following the arrival of reinforcements, the Beni Abdul Kais and Beni Najia tribes who had formed part of the Caliph's army but who had been delayed during the long journey from Medina. Contemporary texts put the death toll at 10,000, although this number was frequently used to signify a large battle rather than being taken as an absolute. The town of Dibba was looted and the captives, one fifth of the treasure and the livestock of the town were sent as tribute to Abu Bakr.

The Omani commander, Hudhayfah, stayed to consolidate the Muslim hold on the territory of Oman while his fellow commander left to pacify Yemen. A third commander, Ikrima, who had failed in Yamama and been censured by Abu Bakr, was sent back to the Caliph accompanying the spoils in order to redeem himself, a generous gesture by his co-commanders. The phrase 'Day of Dibba' is still used, signifying the defeat of paganism by Islam.
