= Wadi Danhah =

Wadi in UAE

Wadi Danhah Wādī Ḍanḥah
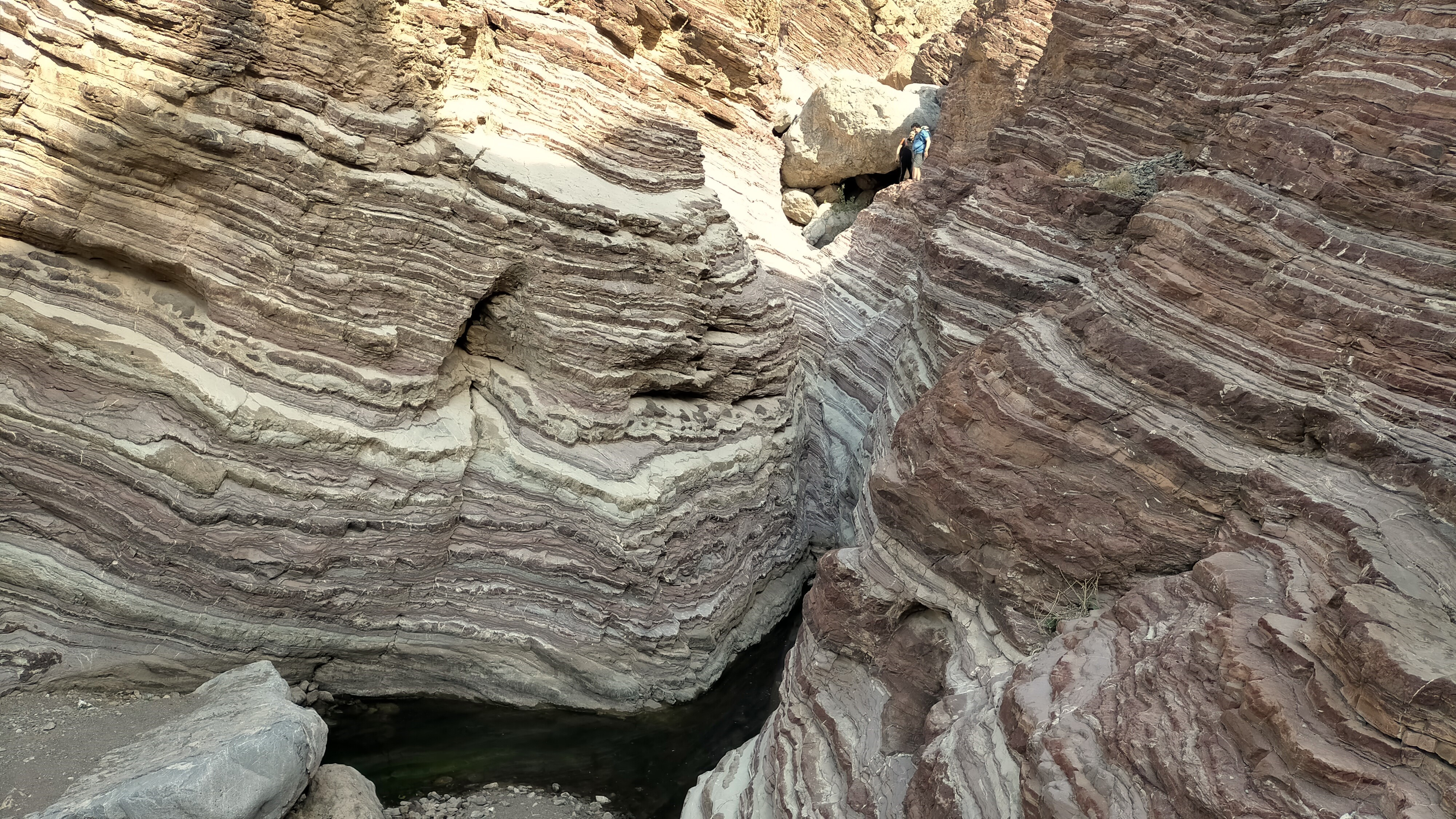
- Wadi Danhah. Gorge and stratified rocks

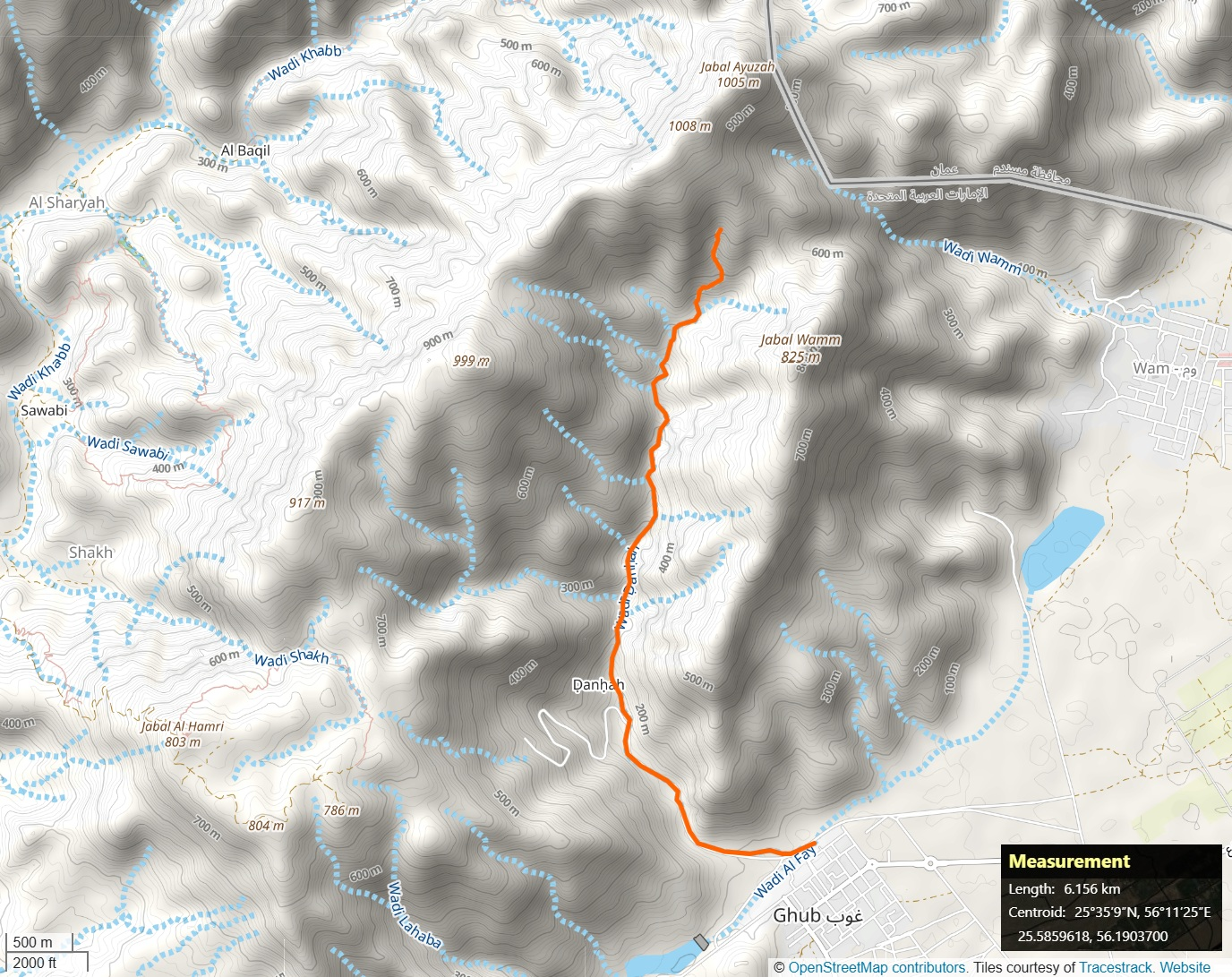
- Location and course of Wadi Danhah

- Location within United Arab Emirates Location within Persian Gulf Location within West and Central Asia
- Native name: وادي ضنحه (Arabic)

Location
- Country: United Arab Emirates
- Emirate: Fujairah

Physical characteristics
- Source: On the southern slope of Jabal Ayuzah (1,005 m (3,297 ft)).
  - elevation: 710 m (2,330 ft), approximately
- Mouth: In Wadi Al Fay.
  - coordinates: 25°34′07″N 56°12′03″E
  - elevation: 81 m (266 ft)
- Length: 6.2 km (3.9 mi)
- Basin size: 13.5 km^{2} (5.2 mi^{2}) (sub-basin)

Basin features
- Progression: Wadi. Intermittent flow
- River system: Wadi Basseirah.

Wadi Danhah (Arabic: وادي ضنحه, romanized: Wādī Ḍanḥah) is a valley or dry river with ephemeral or intermittent flow, flowing almost exclusively during the rainy season, located in the emirate of Fujairah, in the east of the United Arab Emirates.

It is a left tributary of the Wadi Al Fay, and forms a small sub-basin of 13.5 km^{2} (5.2 mi^{2}), which belongs to the larger Wadi Basseirah.

== Course ==
The Wadi Danhah flows from north to south, west of and almost parallel to the mountain range of Jabal Wamm (825 m (2,707 ft)), and has a total length of approximately 6.2 km (3.9 mi).

Its main river source is located at an altitude of approximately 710 m (2,330 ft), on the southern slope of Jabal Ayuzah (1,005 m (3,297 ft)), within the United Arab Emirates, a short distance from the border with Oman.

In its upper reaches, the wadi descends with a moderate gradient. Its bed, however, is full of loose rocks, sudden drops, and some dry waterfalls, making it difficult to traverse and only accessible with rock climbing techniques.

In its middle course, Wadi Danhah forms a deep gorge where erosion caused by the water flow has exposed the multicolored layers of stratified sedimentary rocks, highly polished and of high hardness, predominantly in reddish, ochre and white tones.

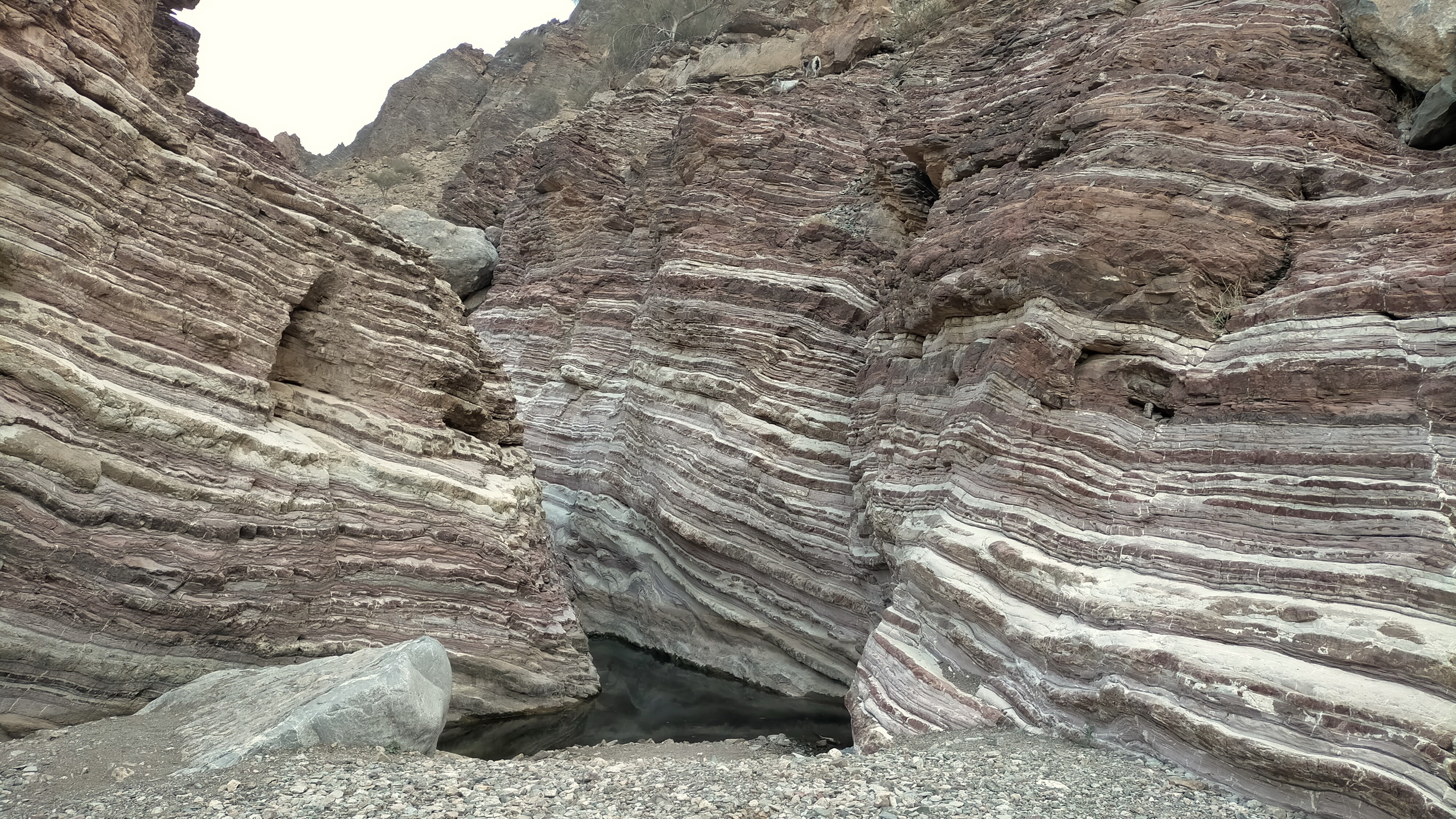
Wadi Danhah - Wadi Zanhah - Gorge and Layered Rocks

Although the area is not easily accessible, this picturesque landscape attracts numerous visitors and has become a popular tourist and hiking destination. For advertising and marketing purposes, some companies promoting guided tours and outdoor tourism activities refer to Wadi Danhah with the marketing names Rainbow Valley or Spectrum Valley, and also by the erroneous name Wadi Ghub.

In its lower reaches, two kilometers before its mouth, Wadi Danhah passes through the village of Danhah (Arabic: ضنحه), with an area featuring small farms, cultivated terraces, and lush palm groves. This area has been severely affected by the operation of large, now abandoned, quarries. In the vicinity of the current town are the ruins of the old village, practically destroyed.

Next to its mouth in the Wadi Al Fay lies the village of Ghub, which has expanded in recent years to the west of the central area of the Dibba / Sayh Dibā floodplain (Arabic: سيح دبا).

== Dams and Reservoirs ==
Like other regions of the UAE, the geographical area of Wadi Danhah has occasionally been affected by unusually heavy rainfall and flooding, but no dams have been built along its banks so far.

== Toponymy ==
Alternative names: Wādī Ḍanḥah, Wādī Ẓanḥah, Wadi Danhah, Wadi Zahah, Wadi Dhanha, Wadi Dhanhah, Wādī Z̧aḩah, Wadi Z̧anḩah.

The name of Wadi Danhah (with the spellings Wadi Dhanha and Wādī Z̧anḩah), its tributaries, mountains and nearby towns, were recorded in the documentation and maps produced between 1950 and 1960 by the British Arabist, cartographer, military officer and diplomat Julian F. Walker, during the work carried out to establish the borders between the then called Trucial States, later completed by the UK Ministry of Defence, with 1:100,000 scale maps published from 1971.

In the National Atlas of the United Arab Emirates it appears as Wādī Ḍanḥah (Arabic: وادي ضنحه).

== Population ==
The area around Wadi Danhah was populated mainly by the Sharqiyin tribe, sections or tribal areas of Dhanahana, Yamāmaḩah and Fuhūd.

Near Wadi Danhah / Wadi Zahnah, there are archaeological remains that testify to human presence in this area since very ancient times.

== See also ==
- Danhah
- List of wadis of the United Arab Emirates
- List of mountains in the United Arab Emirates
- List of wadis of Oman
- List of mountains in Oman
