= Danhah =

Village in the UAE

Danhah ضَنْحَه (Arabic) Ḍanḥah
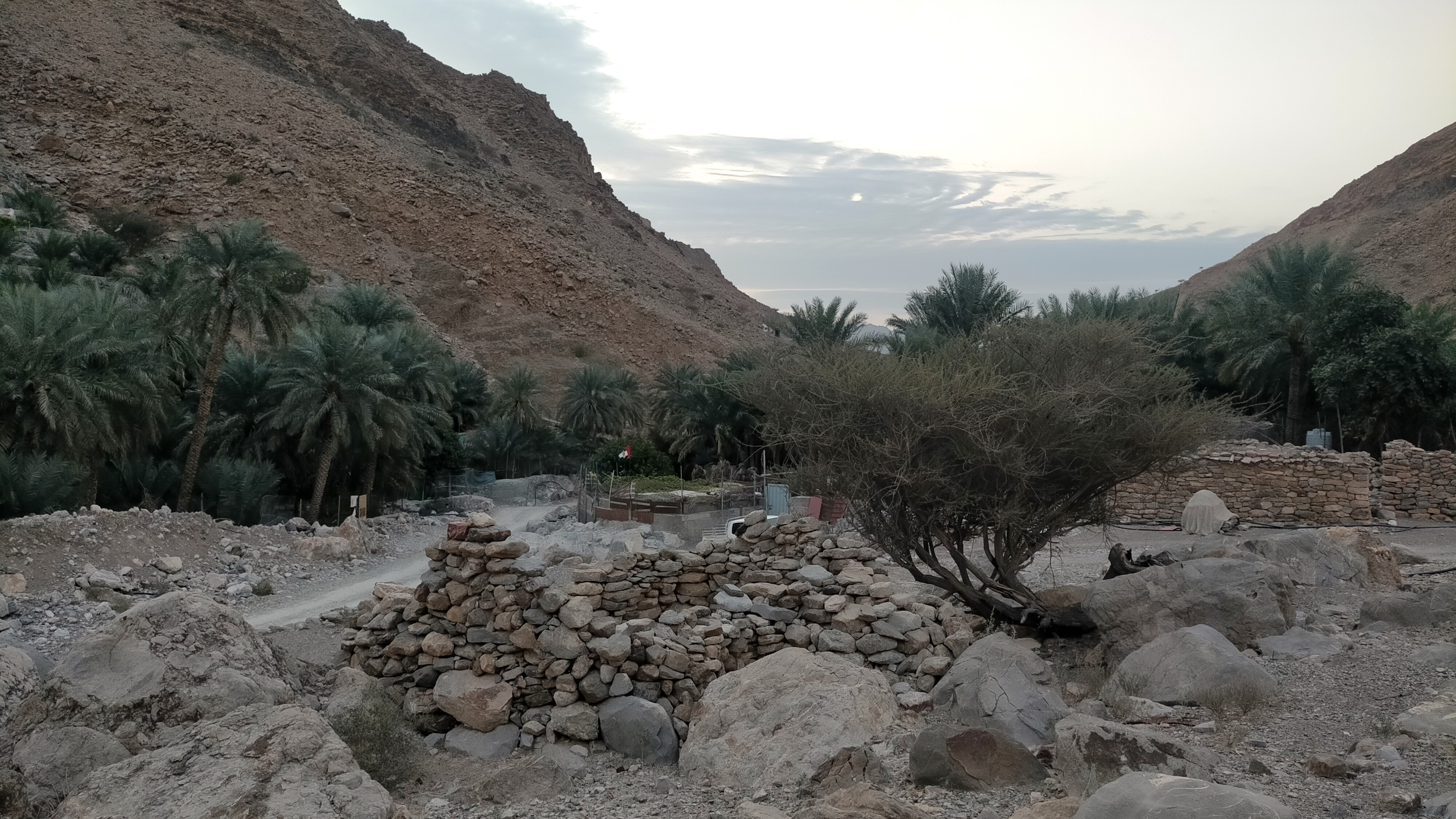
- Danhah – Palm groves and old drystone buildings

- Location of Danhah in the U.A.E. Danhah (Persian Gulf) Danhah (Middle East) Danhah (West and Central Asia)
- Coordinates: 25°34′45″N 56°11′06″E
- Country: United Arab Emirates
- Emirate: Fujairah

Area
  - Total: 0.42 km^{2} (0.16 sq mi)
- Elevation: 170 m (560 ft)
- Time zone: UTC+04:00

Danhah (Arabic: ضَنْحَه, romanized: Ḍanḥah) is a small agricultural and livestock village in the Emirate of Fujairah, northeastern U.A.E.

== Geography and history ==
The village has many small scattered farms, cultivated fields, and lush palm groves, although it has been greatly affected by the activity of large, now abandoned, quarries. In the vicinity of the current town are the ruins of the old village, which is practically destroyed.

Danhah is located on the banks of the Wadi Danhah, a tributary of the Wadi Al Fay.

The Wadi Danhah, in its middle course, forms a deep gorge where erosion caused by water flow has exposed multicolored layers of polished, hard, stratified sedimentary rocks, predominantly in reddish, ochre, and white tones.

This picturesque landscape has allowed Danhah to become a popular tourist and hiking destination in recent years, attracting numerous visitors.

Some of the former inhabitants of the Danhah area moved their permanent homes to the surroundings of the village of Ghub, which has expanded west of the central area of the floodplain of Dibba (Arabic: سَيْح دِبَّا, romanized: Sayḥ Dibbā).

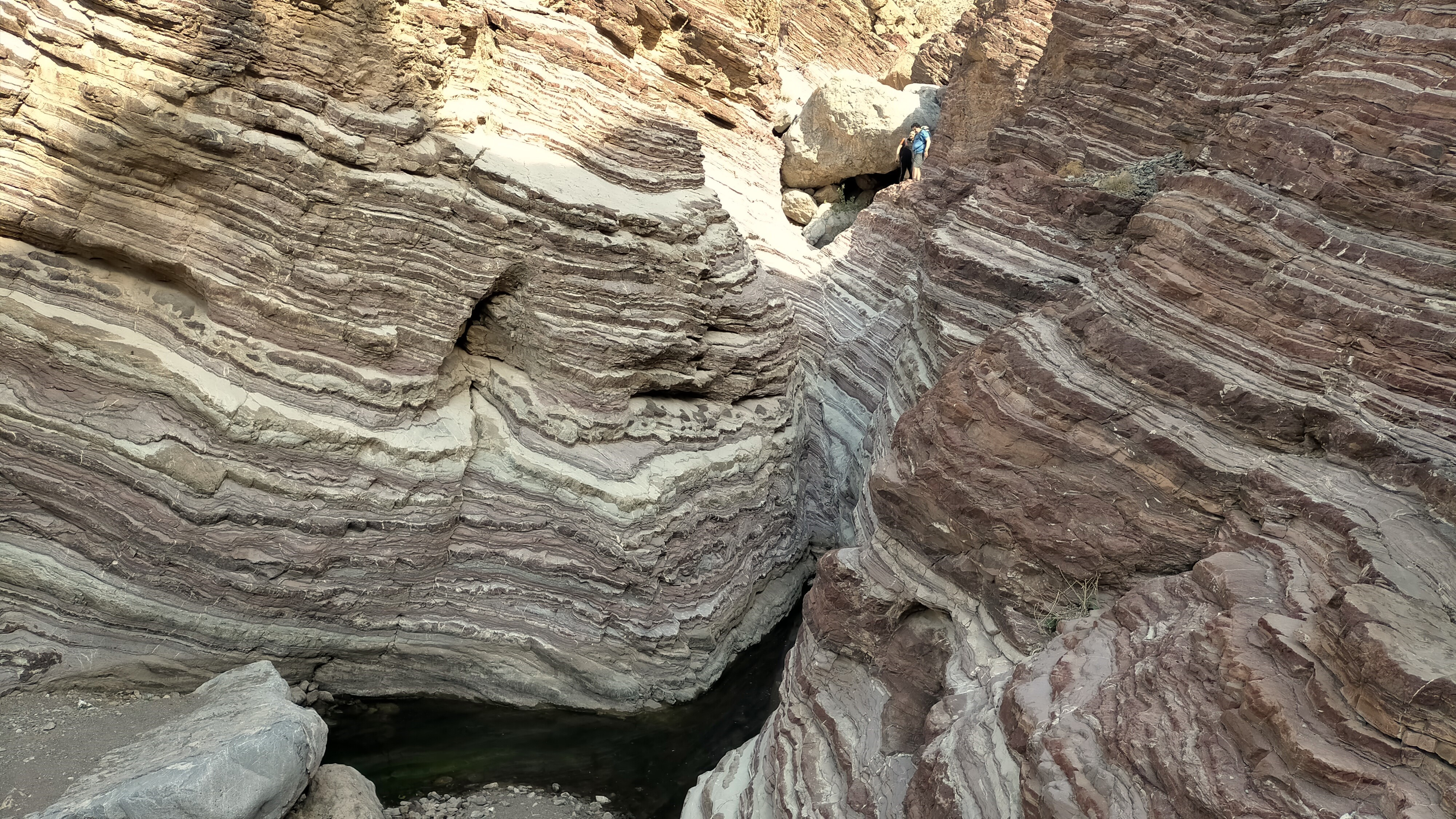
Wadi Danhah - Wadi Zanhah - Gorge and stratified rocks

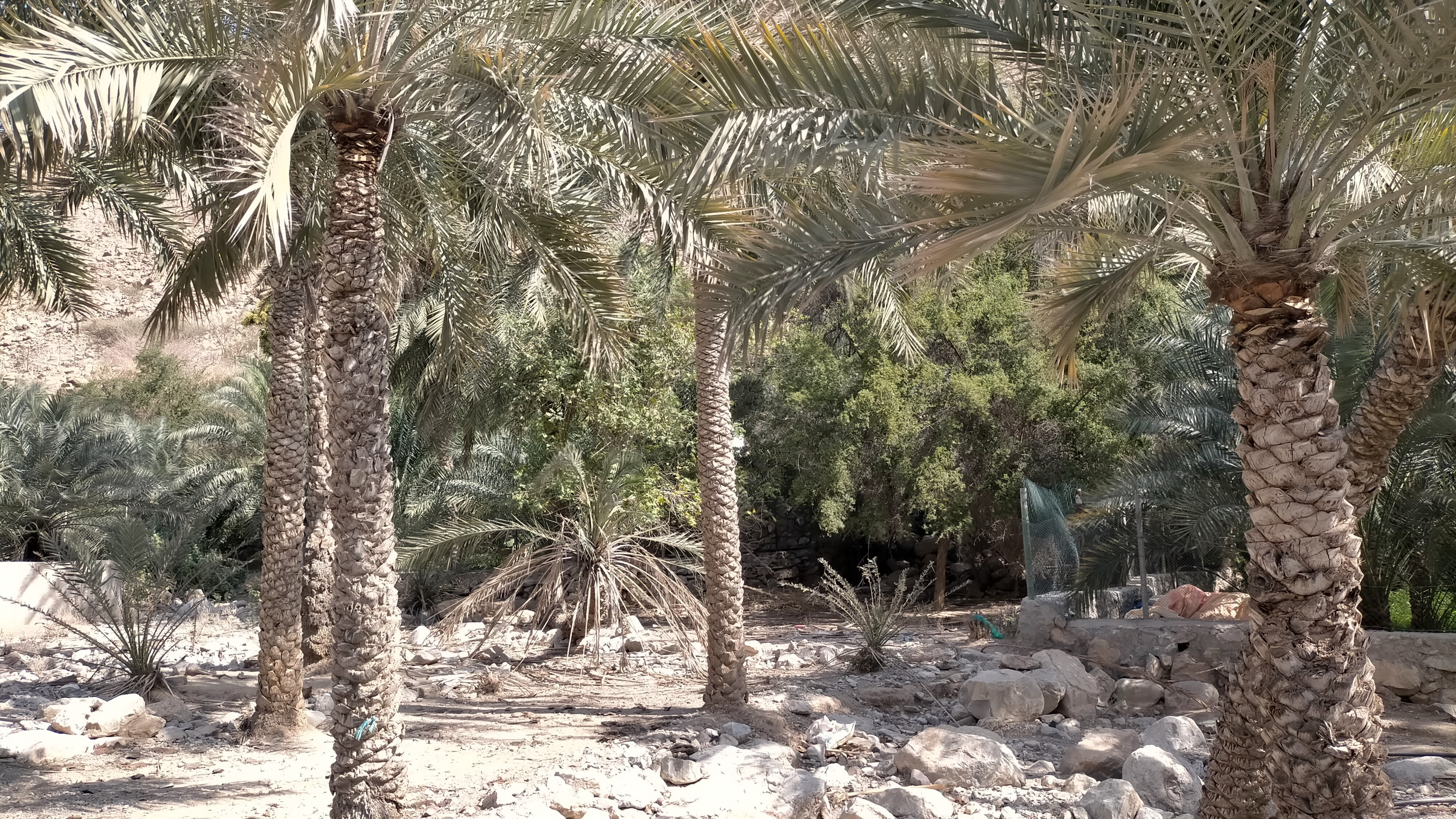
Palm groves and cultivated areas

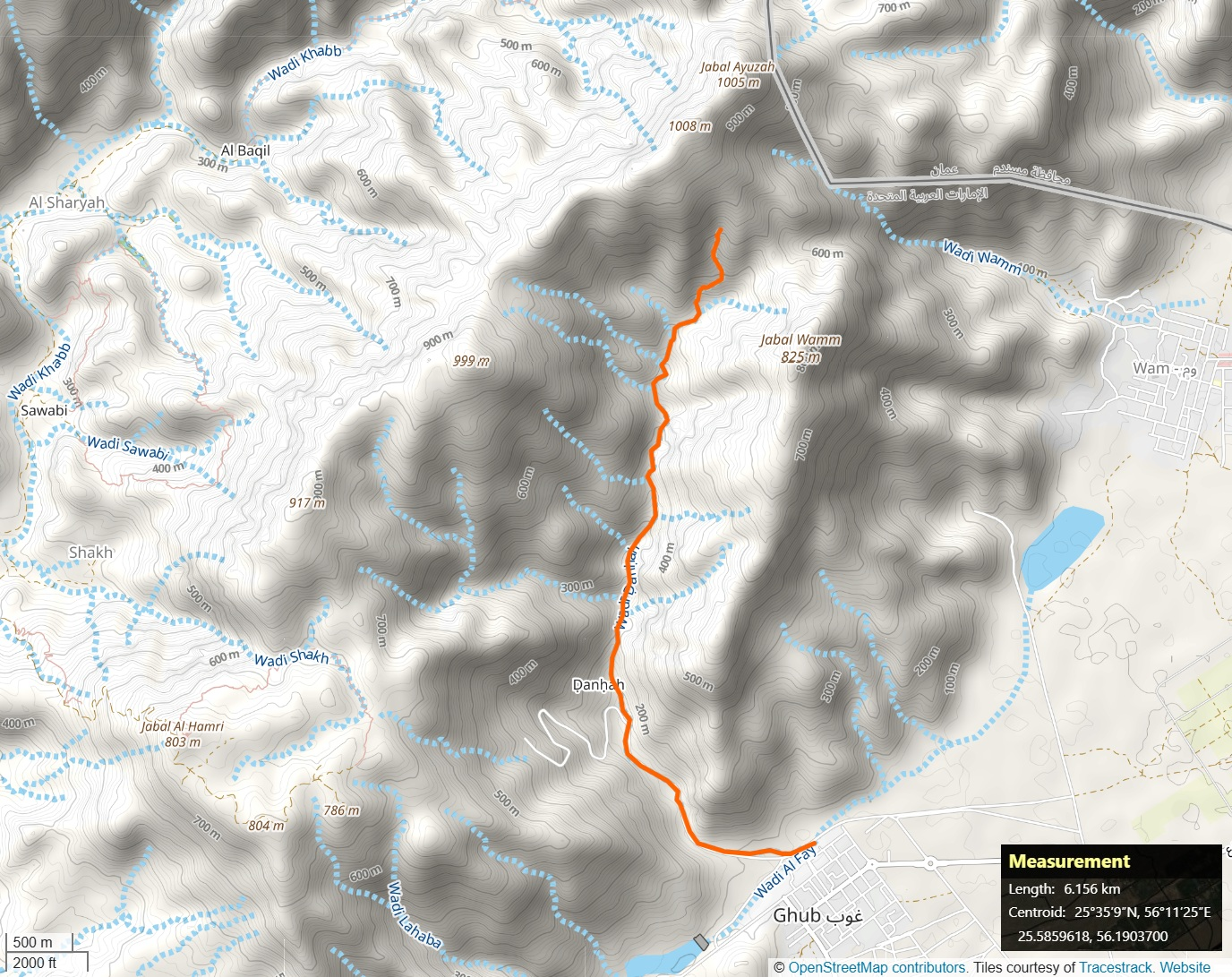
Map of Wadi Danhah - Wadi Zanhah - Emirate of Fujairah

== Toponymy ==
Alternative names: Dhanhah, Z̧anḩah, Zahar, Z̧aḩah, Zanhah, Ḍanḥah, Danhah, Dhanha.

The name Danhah (spelled Dhanha and Z̧anḩah), its wadis, mountains, and nearby towns, were recorded in the documentation and maps produced between 1950 and 1960 by the British Arabist, cartographer, military officer and diplomat Julian F. Walker, during the work carried out to establish the borders between the then so-called Trucial States, later completed by the UK Ministry of Defence, with 1:100,000 scale maps published from 1971 onwards.

The National Atlas of the United Arab Emirates does not expressly mention the name of this village, but Wadi Danhah does, spelled Wādī Ḍanḥah.

== Population ==
The area near the Danhah and Wadi Danhah was mainly populated by the Sharqiyin tribe, specifically the tribal sections or areas of Dhanahana, Yamāmaḩah, and Fuhūd.

Archaeological remains near Danhah / Zanhah testify to human presence in this area since ancient times.

== See also ==
- Eastern Arabia
  - List of wadis of the United Arab Emirates
  - List of mountains in the United Arab Emirates
  - List of wadis of Oman
  - List of mountains in Oman
