= Wadi Al Fay =

Wadi in UAE

Wadi Al Fay Wādī Al Fay
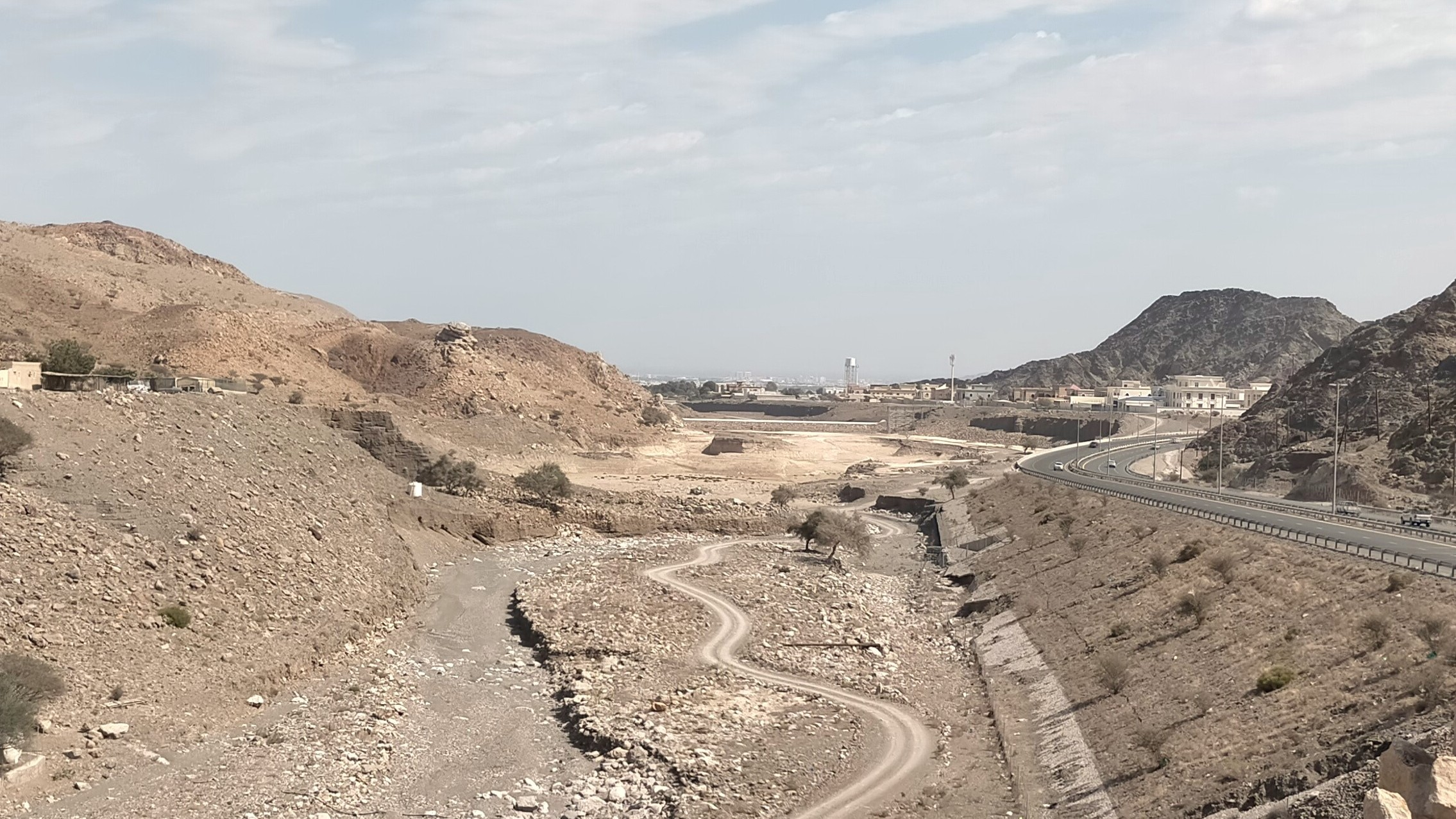
- Wadi Al Fay near Zahir As Safwah

- Location within United Arab Emirates Location within Persian Gulf Location within West and Central Asia
- Native name: وادي الفاي (Arabic)

Location
- Country: United Arab Emirates
- Emirate: Fujairah

Physical characteristics
- Source: On the southern slope of Jabal Mubrahah (593 m (1,946 ft))
  - elevation: 400 m (1,300 ft), approximately
- Mouth: Wam Lake (southwest of Wam city, Emirate of Fujairah)
  - coordinates: 25°34′07″N 56°12′03″E
  - elevation: 42 m (138 ft)
- Length: 15 km (9.3 mi)

Basin features
- Progression: Wadi. Intermittent flow
- River system: Wadi Basseirah.
- Tributaries
  - left: Wadi Ajali, Wadi Lahaba, Wadi Danhah

Wadi Al Fay (Arabic: وادي الفاي, romanized: Wādī Al Fay) is a valley or dry river, with ephemeral or intermittent flow, flowing almost exclusively during the rainy season, located in the emirate of Fujairah, in the eastern part of the United Arab Emirates.

Although geographically part of the large catchment area of the Wadi Basseirah, its lower course runs through the northwestern part of the Dibba / Sayh Dibā floodplain (Arabic: سيح دبا), away from other large wadis that are also part of this basin, such as Wādī Sanah, Wādī Ḑab‘ah, Wadi Al Faryah and Wadi 'Abadilah. These other wadis converge on the same plain before the Al Basseirah Dam (coordinates: 25°31'35.0"N 56°12'40.0"E).

== Course ==
The Wadi Al Fay flows from southwest to northeast, and has a total length of approximately 15 km (9.3 mi). Its main sources are on the southern slope of Jabal Mubrahah (593 m (1,946 ft)), at an approximate altitude of 400 m (1,300 ft).

At the beginning of its middle course, the Wadi Al Fay passes through the village of Al Muhtarqah (Arabic: المحترقة, romanized: Al Miḥtarqah), located in the historic Qaliddi Route, which connected the city of Ras Al Khaimah and other towns on the coast of the Persian Gulf to the city of Dibba on the coast of the Gulf of Oman.

Adjacent to the village of Al Muhtarqah is the mountain pass of Al Qaliddi (Aqabat al Qaliddi)., an important crossing for caravans that followed the Qaliddi route in both directions, making it a strategic reference and supply point.

From Al Muhtarqah, the Qaliddi route to the Gulf of Oman coast headed northeast, following the course of the Wadi Al Fay. This wadi's course was later partially used for the construction of the modern E87 - Al Shuhada Road highway, which significantly affected and altered its natural flow.

As it flows towards the sea, the Wadi Al Fay receives the confluence of several small tributaries, including Wadi Ajali, Wadi Lahaba, and Wadi Danhah. It also passes through the villages of Dhahir/Zahir al Ya'ad, Dhahir/Zahir As Safwah, and Ghub.

Infrastructure projects aimed at preventing flooding in urban and industrial areas along the coast necessitated the channeling and diversion of part of the lower course of the Wadi Al Fay. It now flows into a large and deep reservoir, covering 200,000 m^{2} (0.077 mi^{2}), known as Wam Lake, which was excavated in the floodplain southwest of Wam city.

== Dams and Reservoirs ==
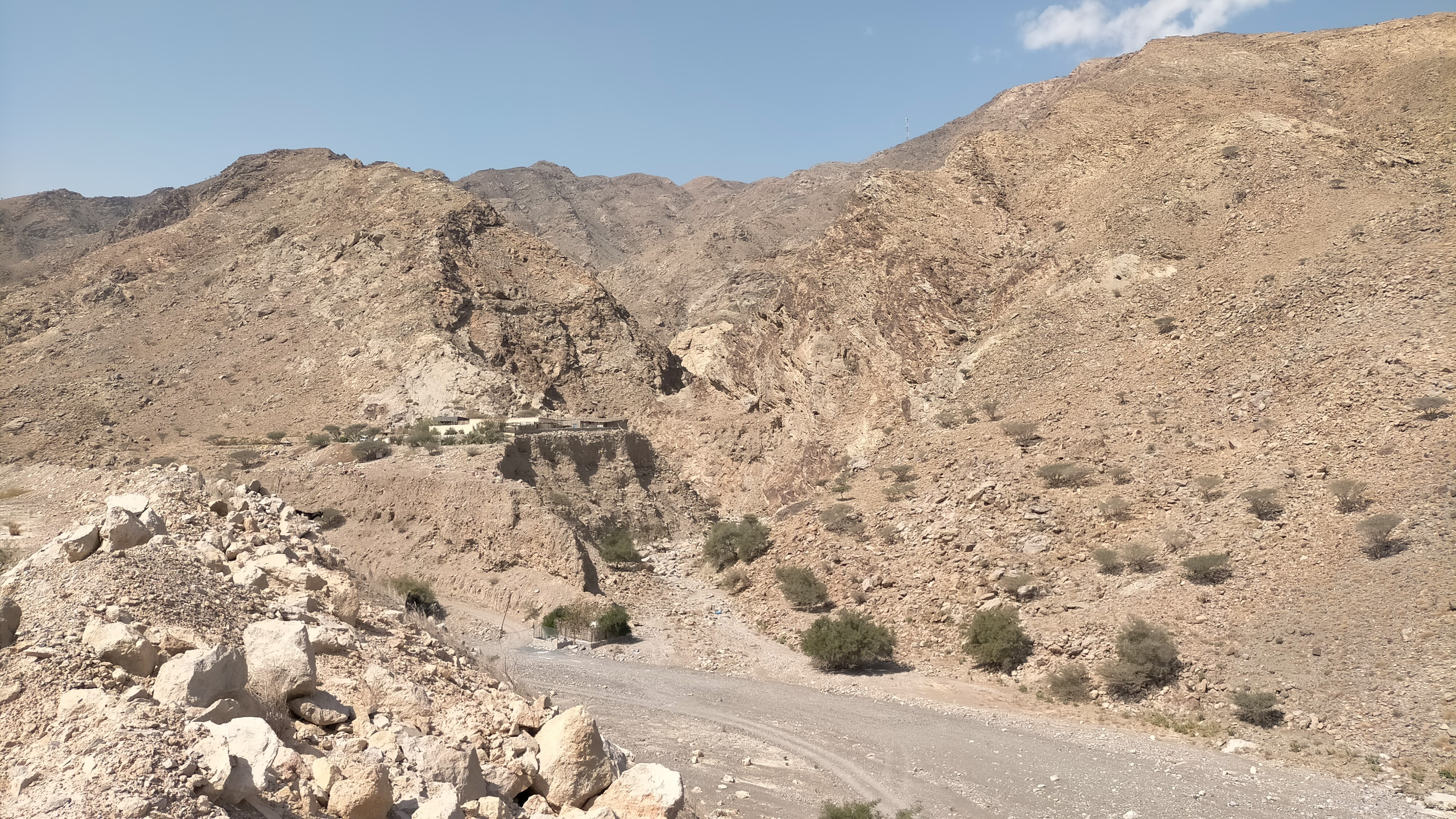
Wadi Al Fay - Wadi Al Fay near Zahir As Safwah, Emirate of Fujairah.

Like other areas in the UAE, the Wadi Al Fay region has occasionally experienced unusually heavy rainfall and flooding.

To mitigate the risk of flash floods and enhance groundwater recharge, a 5 m (16 ft)-high dam was constructed in 1998 across the Wadi Al Fay riverbed, just before the village of Ghub, called Wadi Al Fay Dam (Arabic: سد وادي) (coordinates: 25°33′44″N, 56°11′33″E).

Also in 1998, a second smaller dam was built, called Wadi Al Fay Breaker (Arabic: حاجز الفاي) (coordinates: 25°34′18″N, 56°12′18″E).

== Toponymy ==
Alternative names: Wadi Fai, Wadi al Fay', Wādī Fai, Wādī al Fay’, Wadi Al Fay.

The name of Wadi Al Fay (spelled as Wādī al Fa’y and Wadi Fai), its tributaries, mountains and nearby towns, was recorded in the documentation and maps drawn up between 1950 and 1960 by the British Arabist, cartographer, military officer and diplomat Julian F. Walker, during the work carried out to establish the borders between the then called Trucial States, later completed by the UK Ministry of Defence, with 1:100,000 scale maps published from 1971 onwards.

In the National Atlas of the United Arab Emirates it appears as Wādī Al Fay (Arabic: وادي الفي).

== Population ==
The area around Wadi Al Fay was populated mainly by the Sharqiyin tribe, a tribal section of Jamāmaḩah.

Archaeological remains in the vicinity of Wadi Al Fay indicate human presence in this area from very early times.

== See also ==
- List of wadis of the United Arab Emirates
- List of mountains in the United Arab Emirates
- List of wadis of Oman
- List of mountains in Oman
