= Mosul Grand Mosque =

Incomplete Sunni mosque in Mosul, Iraq

- جامع الموصل الكبير
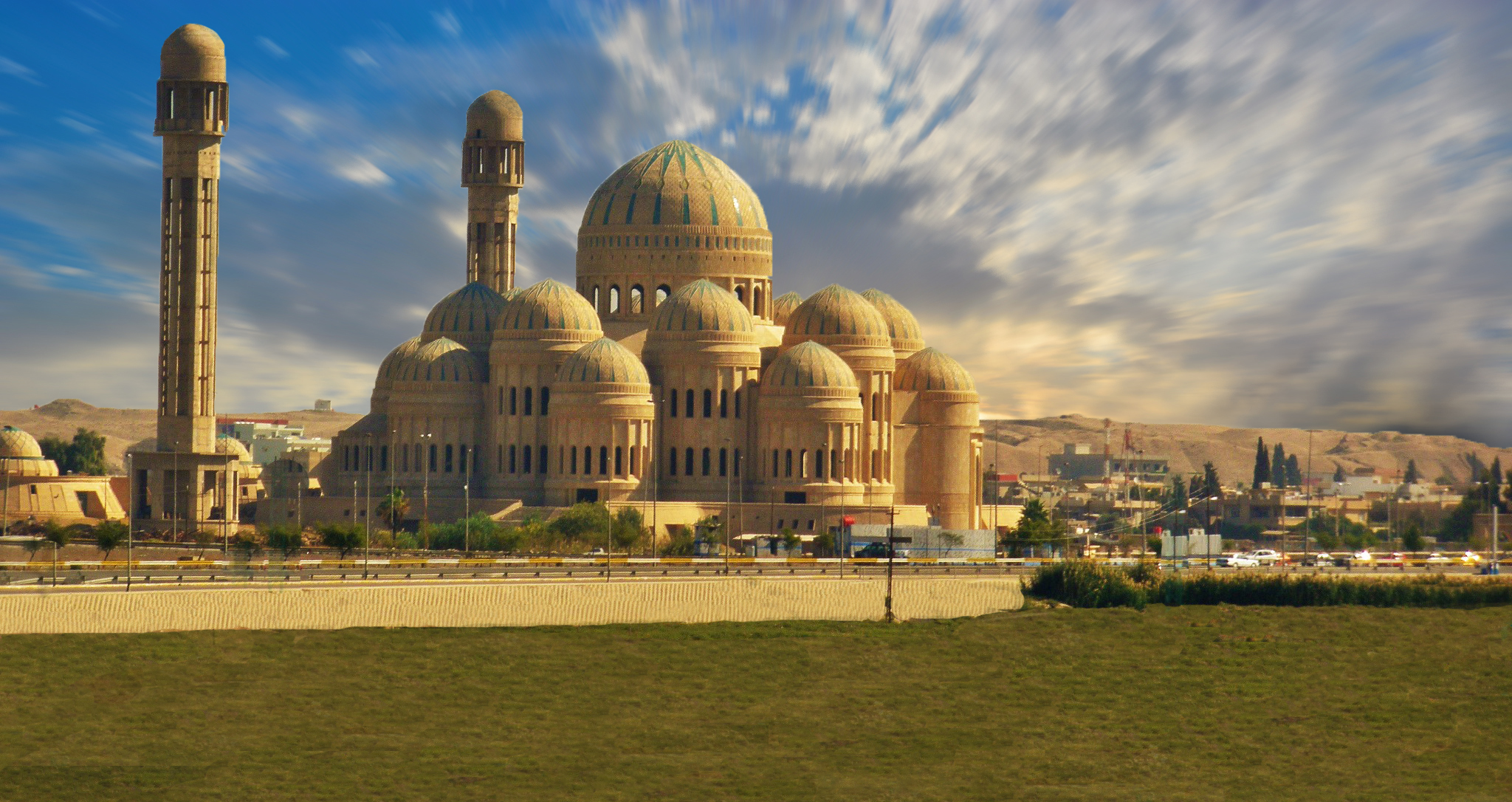
- The partially completed mosque, in 2014

- Location of the mosque in Iraq

Religion
- Affiliation: Sunni Islam (when complete)
- Ecclesiastical or organizational status: Mosque (when complete)
- Status: Under construction

Location
- Location: Mosul, Nineveh Governorate
- Country: Iraq
- Interactive map of Mosul Grand Mosque
- Coordinates: 36°21′28″N 43°08′30″E

Architecture
- Type: Mosque
- Groundbreaking: c. 1985
- Completed: incomplete

Specifications
- Dome: Ten
- Minaret: Two

The Mosul Grand Mosque (Arabic: جامع الموصل الكبير) is an incomplete Sunni mosque located in Mosul, in the Nineveh Governorate of Iraq. It is situated in the Taqafah district, bordering the Tigris river near the Nineveh archeological site. When completed, it will be the largest mosque in Mosul.

Its construction started during the rule of Saddam Hussein - it was previously known as "Saddam Mosque" - and works were interrupted because of the political instability in the country. As of 2025, the building is incomplete.

During the 2017 Battle of Mosul, the incomplete mosque was damaged by ISIL forces. In February 2019, the Nineveh Governorate municipality announced that construction had been resumed with a US$50 million grant from the United Arab Emirates. A completion date was not set.

== Gallery ==
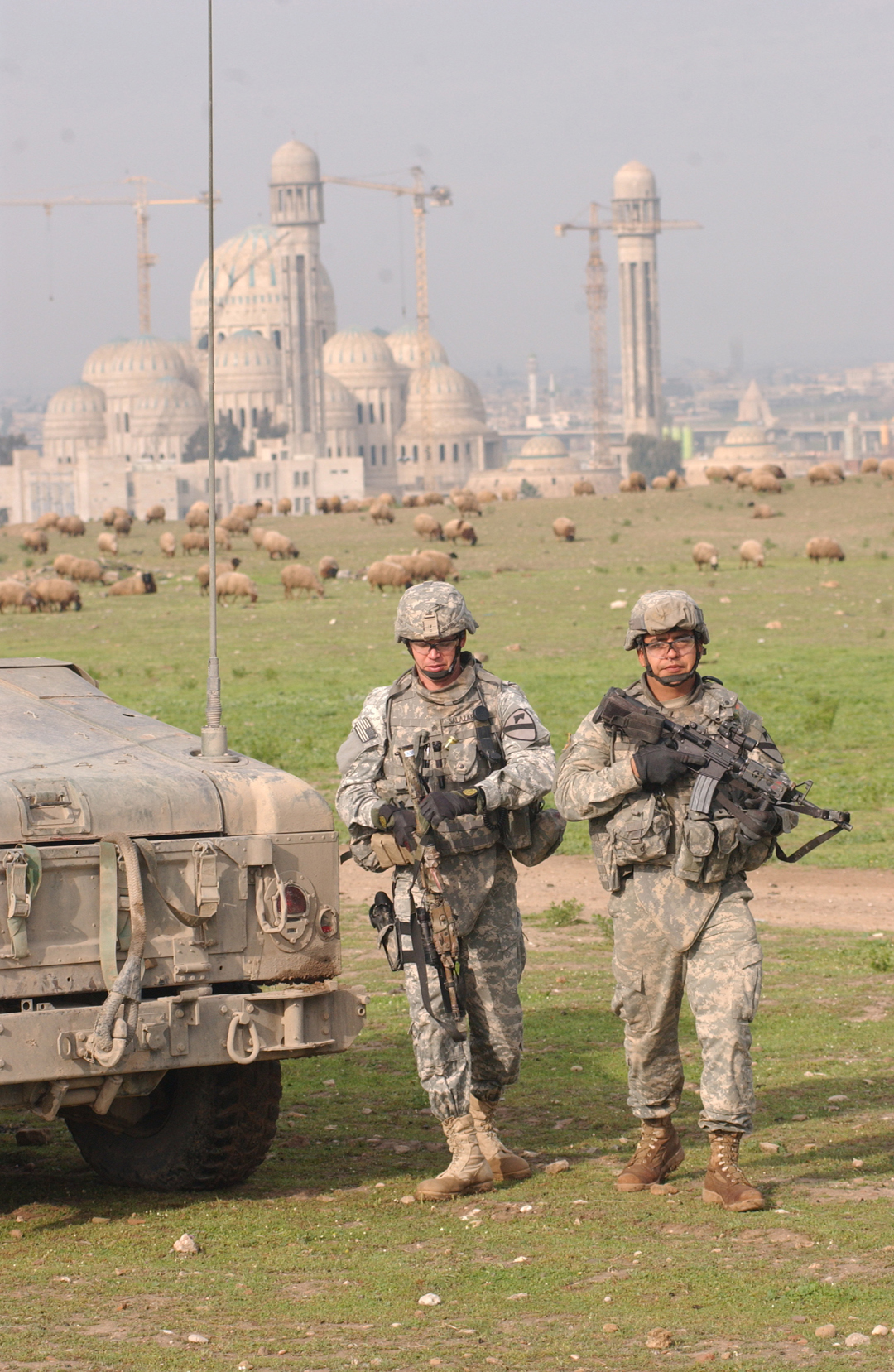
U.S. troops patrol the area around the mosque, in 2007

== See also ==
- Islam in Iraq
- List of mosques in Iraq
