= Dibba =

Coastal area in within Oman and the UAE

Coordinates: 25°37′N 56°16′E

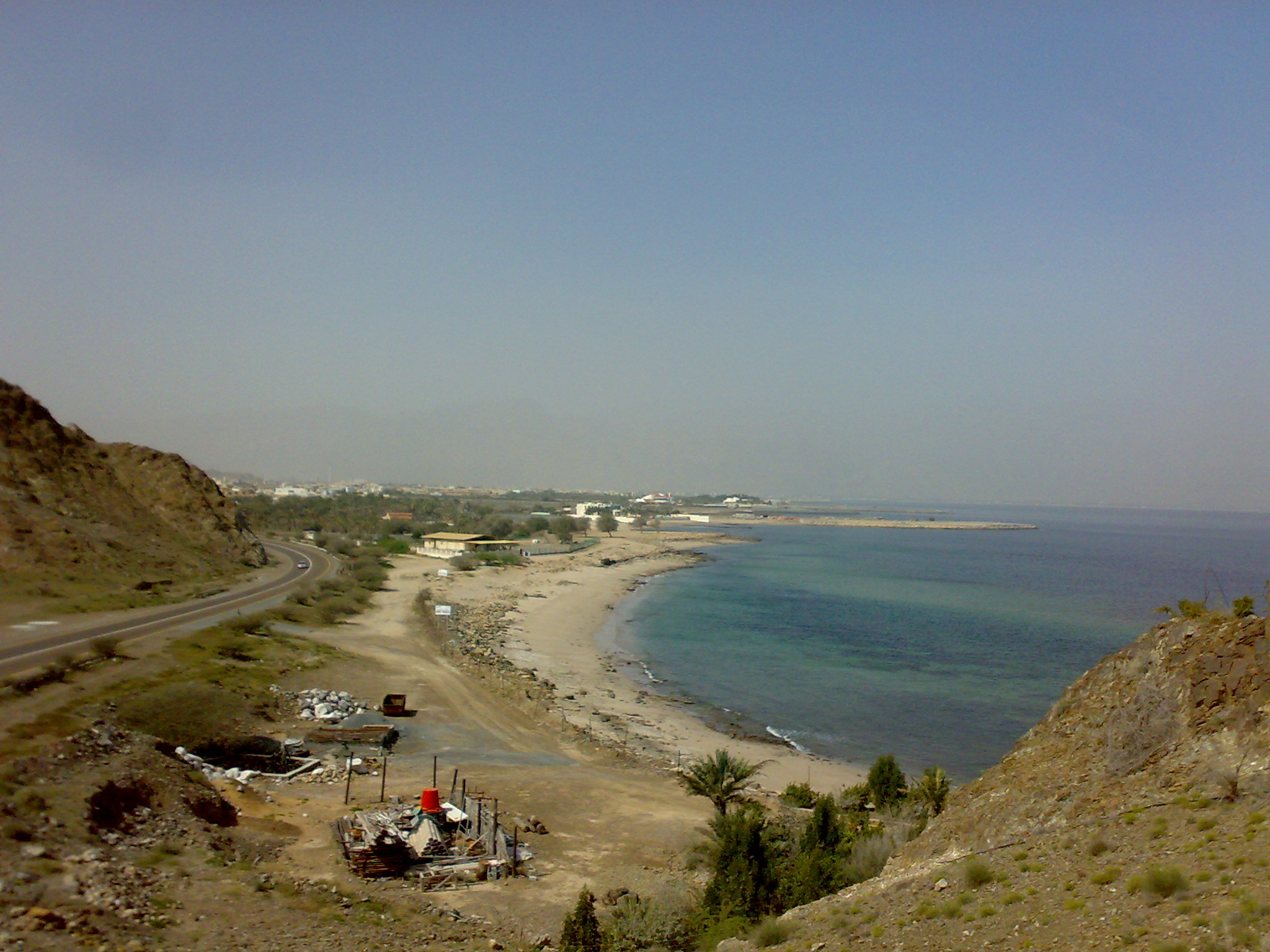
View of Rul Dibba cape from 6 km east of Dibba city, Emirate of Fujairah, northeastern UAE. In the background, dimly visible, are the mountains of Musandam, Oman.

Dibbā (Arabic: دِبَّا) is a coastal area at the northern tip of the eastern Arabian Peninsula on the Gulf of Oman.

== Political administration ==
Dibba is politically divided into three segments:

- Dibba Al-Fujairah, ruled by the Emirate of Fujairah, UAE
- Dibba Al-Hisn, ruled by the Emirate of Sharjah, UAE
- Dibba Al-Baya, ruled by the Musandam Governorate, Oman

== History ==
This large natural harbor on the east coast of the northern Emirates has been an important site of maritime trade and settlement for millennia, with relatively recent excavations underpinning the importance of the town as a site of entrepot trade throughout the Iron Age and into the late pre-Islamic era. A collective tomb, discovered by accident in 2004, led to a number of excavations in the area of the present town which have yielded evidence of a large settlement with layers of occupation and significant finds of trade goods, bitumen, ceramics and glass as well as coins. Three copper alloy tetradrachms were found at the site which, as well as pottery finds, link it to the Hellenistic period at the major pre-Islamic cities of Mleiha and Ed-Dur, while Roman amphorae, ceramics and glass attest to a continuity of not only occupation but a lively regional trade. Finds at the site attest to trade links with Bahrain, north-eastern Arabia, Iran, Mesopotamia and India, while amphorae, terra sigillata, glass and intaglios demonstrate connections between Dibba and the Roman Empire - two intaglios found in the town were engraved with figures of Perseus and Medusa (similar to one found in southern Thailand), further suggesting an extensive pre-Islamic trade network stretching far to the East.

Under the Sasanians, and their clients, the Julanda and Azd, an important market existed at Dibba. The Julanda, reported to the Persian marzban (military governor), based at Al-Rustaq in what is now Oman. According to Ibn Habib, "merchants from Sindh, India, China, people of the East and West came to it."

=== Battle of Dibba ===
Soon after the death of the Islamic Prophet Muhammad a rebellion broke out at Dibba and a faction of the Azd, led by Laqit bin Malik Dhu at-Taj, rejected Islam. According to one tradition Laqit was killed by an envoy of the caliph Abu Bakr in what may have been a relatively small struggle, while other sources including al-Tabari say that at least 10,000 rebels were killed in one of the biggest battles of the Ridda wars, the Battle of Dibba. The plain behind Dibba still contains a large cemetery which according to local tradition represents the fallen apostates of Dibba. Thereafter, the region of southeast Arabia became nearly entirely Muslim.

During the time of the Abbasid caliph Al-Mu'tadid (CE 870–892), a great battle was fought at Dibba during the conquest of Oman by the Abbasid governor of Iraq and Bahrain, Muhammad ibn Nur. Thereafter references to Dibba in historical literature are scarce until we come to the Portuguese who built a fortress there. Dibba (Debe) appears in the list of southeast Arabian placenames preserved by the Venetian jeweler Gasparo Balbi in CE 1580 and depictions of its Portuguese fort can be found in several sources, such as Armando Cortesão's Portugaliae Monumenta Cartographica.

=== Portuguese ===
Around 1620–1625 the Italian traveler Pietro Della Valle, while staying with the Sultan of Bandar Abbas, met the son of the ruler of Dibba. From this he learned that Dibba had formerly been subject to the Kingdom of Hormuz, but was at that time loyal to the Safavids. In 1623, Safavids sent troops to Dibba, Khor Fakkan and other ports on the south-east coast of Arabia in order to prepare for a Portuguese counter-attack, following their expulsion from Hormuz (Jarun). The Portuguese, under Rui Freire, were so successful that the people of Dibba turned on their Safavid overlords putting them all to death, whereupon a Portuguese garrison of 50 men was installed at Dibba. More Portuguese forces had to be sent to Dibba in 1627 as a result of an Arab revolt. Two years later the Portuguese proposed moving part of the Mandaean population of southern Iraq to Dibba under pressure from neighboring Arab tribes. Although Dibba was offered to the Mandaeans they were wise enough to see that the Portuguese force there would be insufficient to guarantee their security and, while a few Mandaeans tested the waters by moving to Muscat, most returned to Basra in CE 1630.

In 1645 the Portuguese still held Dibba but the Dutch, searching for potential sites for new commercial activities, sent the warship Zeemeeuw ('Seagull') to explore the Musandam Peninsula between Khasab, on the Persian Gulf side, and Dibba on the east coast. Claes Speelman, the captain of the Zeemeeuw, made drawings in his logbook, including what is certainly the earliest depiction of Dibba in a European source. Within a year or two the Portuguese were forced out of Dibba and held only Khasab and Muscat, which they finally lost in 1650.

Eleven years later, Jacob Vogel's description of the east coast of the Oman peninsula, prepared for the Dutch East India Company in 1666, contained the following: "Dabba (which we were unable to visit because of calm and counter currents) is a place (according to the interpreter assigned to us) with about 300 small houses constructed from branches of date trees. During the days of the Portuguese, there were here four fortresses of which the biggest one is still standing. This place also has a valley with a lot of date trees under which there are water wells, where one can get fresh water. At the Northern side of Dabba there is a small freshwater river where the fishermen live.".

The 1900s witnessed land disputes over Dibba.

== Geology ==
The Dibba Fault is an active fault, which means that it had a displacement or seismic activity during the geologically recent period, and is one of the two faults that run through the UAE. The fault crosses into Oman from the north and runs southward to the center of the Arabian Peninsula. Gulf News reported that people in Dibba have felt at least 150 tremors during 2003 and 2004 which indicates that there is a major earthquake waiting to happen in the area. Dibba also felt the 2005 Qeshm earthquake.

The Mesozoic and the Cenozoic accretionary wedge is truncated on the western side by the right lateral fault, the Zendan Fault – Oman Line. West of the transform are the Zagros Mountains of southern Iran, the Musandam peninsula and the Oman Mountains, and the Arabian platform and the Dibba Fault. The Dibba Fault separates the ophiolites in the Oman Mountains from the Mesozoic carbonates in the Musandam Peninsula.

On 31 March 2009, Gulfnews reported that the UAE's National Centre of Metrology and Seismology (NCMS) recorded two earth tremors, measuring magnitudes of 2.9 and 3.5 on the Richter scale, which shook the Gulf of Aden and the north of Dibba at 6.21 am and 9.35 am. The tremors were lightly felt in some areas of the northern emirates.

== Marine life ==
In 2008 an algal bloom affected the sea around Dibba and reached the tourist hot-spots of 'Aqqah and Al-Faqeet, which contain several high-end resorts. 95% of corals in the Dibba Marine Protected Zone were destroyed and the fish population dwindled to a minimum. Rita Bento, a marine biologist working with the Emirates Diving Association (EDA), said she saw only three fish during an hour-long dive in an area where previously hundreds were seen.

== Climate ==
Dibba is located in the Tropical and Subtropical Desert Climate according to the Köppen climate classification. The warmest month is July with an average temperature of 33.8 °C (92.8 °F). The coldest month is January, with an average temperature of 19.2 °C (66.6 °F).

Climate data for Dibba (2000–2009)
Month	Jan	Feb	Mar	Apr	May	Jun	Jul	Aug	Sep	Oct	Nov	Dec	Year
Mean daily maximum °C (°F)	23.4 (74.1)	24.1 (75.4)	27.2 (81.0)	31.6 (88.9)	36.6 (97.9)	37.8 (100.0)	36.7 (98.1)	35.8 (96.4)	34.9 (94.8)	33.4 (92.1)	29.4 (84.9)	25.5 (77.9)	31.4 (88.5)
Mean daily minimum °C (°F)	15.0 (59.0)	16.1 (61.0)	19.0 (66.2)	22.9 (73.2)	27.6 (81.7)	29.6 (85.3)	30.8 (87.4)	29.8 (85.6)	27.7 (81.9)	23.7 (74.7)	20.0 (68.0)	17.1 (62.8)	23.3 (73.9)
Average rainfall mm (inches)	17.4 (0.69)	8.5 (0.33)	13.7 (0.54)	3.7 (0.15)	0.1 (0.00)	0.3 (0.01)	0.4 (0.02)	0.0 (0.0)	trace	0.3 (0.01)	6.5 (0.26)	17.9 (0.70)	68.8 (2.71)
Source: World Meteorological Organization

=== Natural disasters ===
In June 2007, Dibba was affected by Cyclone Gonu, which caused damage to buildings and homes.

== Archaeology ==
There is evidence of extensive ancient settlement and Dibba was an international market on the coast of Oman frequented by merchants from India and China sailing through the Arabian Sea. Indian and Chinese merchant activity has also been discovered in Dibba, and in Chinese sources as well.

== Towns ==
- Dibba Al-Fujairah on the east coast is one of the largest towns in Fujairah. It contains several small villages located between the mountains and the seacoast. In winter people from all over the Emirates travel to Dibba to camp in the mountains and in summer they enjoy water sports and the sandy beaches. Beaches in Dibba are considered among the best of the UAE and have many luxury hotels.
- Dibba Al-Hisn is bordered by the Gulf of Oman to the east, Dibba Al-Baya to the north, and Dibba Al-Fujairah to the south. It is the smallest in size among the other "Dibbas" and is notable mostly for its fish market and a fortress, after which the town is named. Its population density is greater than the other towns. There have been land disputes between Dibba Al-Hisn and Dibba Al-Baya, which were resolved in the 1990s. Dibba Al-Hisn is believed to be the site where the Portuguese built a fort and a wall around the city during the Iberian Union.
- Dibba Al-Baya is the most northerly of the three "Dibbas" and acts as a gateway to the Musandam Peninsula.

== Notable people ==
- Al Muhallab ibn Abi Suffrah, an Azdi Arab and an eminent military commander born in Dibba, whose name appeared on the first-edition of the United Arab Emirates dirham coins shortly after the people of the country accepted Islam.
- Laqit bin Malik: also known as the "Crowned One (Dhul'-Taj)", the leader of the Al Riddah, or apostasizing movement, who rose against the local Muslim Julanda rulers. An army led by Hudayfa and supported by Ikrimah ibn Abi-Jahl and 'Arfaja arrived at the area of Tuwwam (which includes the modern areas of Al Ain and Al-Buraimi), where they wrote to local tribes to convince them to abandon the revolt. They then marched against and defeated Laqit in battle at Dibba, where reports of combined casualties of 10,000 are mentioned. Hudayfah then remained in Oman as governor restoring peace with the local tribes and bringing them back to the fold of Islam, while the remaining troops continued to chase the apostates into Mahra and then to Ash-Shihr in Yemen, both being in South Arabia.

== See also ==
- Dhanha
- Oman–United Arab Emirates border
