= Siege of Shushtar =

Ancient battle in the Muslim conquest of Khuzestan

- Part of the Muslim conquest of Khuzestan
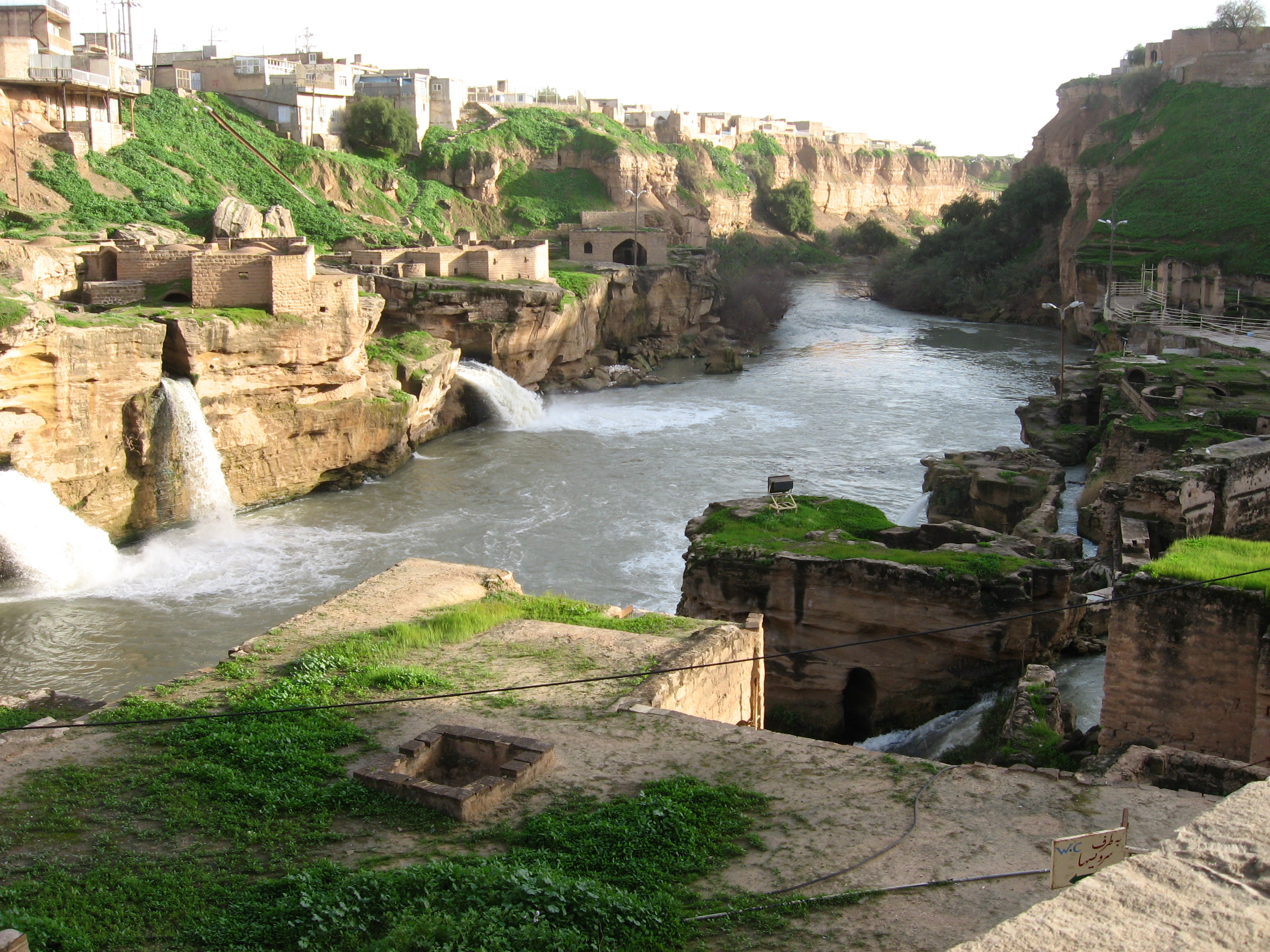
- Picture of the remains of Sasanian architecture in Shushtar
Date	641–642
Location	Shushtar, Sasanian Empire (in modern Khuzestan)
Result	Rashidun victory

Belligerents
Sasanian Empire; Asawira	Rashidun Caliphate; Asawira

Commanders and leaders
Hormuzan (POW); Siyah al-Uswari; Shiruya al-Uswari	Abu Musa al-Ash'ari al-Nu'man; Siyah al-Uswari; Shiruya al-Uswari; Majza'a ibn Thawr al-Sadusi †; Al-Bara' ibn Malik (WIA)

Casualties and losses
Heavy	Low

The siege of Shushtar was fought from 641 to 642 between the Sasanian Empire and the invading Arab Muslims of the Rashidun Caliphate. Shushtar was an ancient strong stronghold in Khuzestan, and was attacked by the Arabs under their commander Abu Musa Ashaari. Although the city managed to resist the Arabs, the Sasanians later faced desertion, which resulted in the Arabs capturing the city and capturing its commander, Hormuzan.

== Background ==
In 633, the Rashidun Arabs invaded the territories of the Byzantine and Sasanian Empire. By 637, the Arabs owned the Sasanian capital Ctesiphon, all of Iraq, and large parts of Syria. One year later, they invaded the rich Sasanian province Khuzestan, which was part of the domains of the Iranian aristocrat Hormuzan, who had, following the fall of Ctesiphon, retreated to Hormizd-Ardashir, which he used as his base in his raids in Meshan against the Arabs. The Sasanian king Yazdegerd III (r. 632–651) supported him in these raids and believed that it was possible to regain the territories that had been taken by the Arabs.

Hormuzan was eventually defeated and asked for peace, which the Arabs accepted in return for tribute. However, Hormuzan soon broke the peace by stopping paying tributes but was once again defeated, while the cities of Khuzestan were slowly subjugated one by one. Sometime later in 641, after a defeat at Ram-Hormizd, Hormuzan fled to Shushtar, and was defeated near the city, but managed to reach it, while 900 of his men were killed, and 600 were captured and would later be executed. The Arabs then laid siege to the city.

== Siege ==
Shushtar was well fortified due to the rivers and canals that surrounded it on almost all sides. One of them was known as Ardashiragan, named after the first Sasanian king Ardashir I (r. 224–240). Another was known as Shamiram, named after the legendary Assyrian Queen Semiramis. The last one mentioned was known as Darayagan, named after the Achaemenid king Darius I (r. 550–486 BCE). There are several versions of how the city got captured; according to al-Tabari, during the siege, an Iranian defector named Sina (or Sinah) went to al-Nu'man and pleaded for his life to be spared in return for helping him how to show a way into the city. Al-Nu'man agreed, and Sina told him the following thing: "attack via the outlet of the water, and then you will conquer the city."

Al-Nu'man did as he told him, and with a small portion of his army, charged into Shushtar. These small units who infiltrated and opened the gate of Shushtar were led by Al-Bara' ibn Malik. Hormuzan then retreated to the citadel and continued his resistance, but was eventually forced to surrender. According to another version written in the Khuzestan Chronicle, similar to the version by al-Tabari, a defector from Qatar, along with another person, asked the Arabs for some of their plunder in exchange for showing them how to enter the city. The Arabs agreed, and after some time, they managed to enter the city. According to al-Baladhuri, during the siege, the Arabs were reinforced with a group of professional Iranian elites under Siyah al-Uswari, known as the Asawira.

The reason for their defection was to preserve their status and wealth. However, according to the Khuzestan Chronicle, the Asawira first defected to the Arabs after they entered Shushtar. The brother of Hormuzan, Shahriyar, is said to have been a part of the Asawira.

== Aftermath ==
After his defeat, Hormuzan was taken captive by the Arabs and sent to their capital Medina, while the Arabs continued their invasions into Iran. Hormuzan, after being threatened to choose between death and Islam, converted to Islam. Hormuzan was later suspected as being part of the assassination of the Rashidun caliph Umar, and was put to death. By 651, most of Iran was under the control of the Arabs, and Yazdegerd III had been assassinated under the orders of his servant Mahoe Suri, an aristocrat from the Suren family, who served as the governor (marzban) of Merv, a powerful Sasanian stronghold. In 654, all of Iran was under the possession of the Arabs.

== Sources ==
- Shahbazi, A. Shapur. (1983). "HORMOZĀN". Encyclopaedia Iranica, Vol. I, Fasc. 5. pp. 460–461.
- Pourshariati, Parvaneh (2008). Decline and Fall of the Sasanian Empire: The Sasanian-Parthian Confederacy and the Arab Conquest of Iran. London and New York: I.B. Tauris. ISBN 978-1-84511-645-3.
- Zarrinkub, Abd al-Husain (1975). "The Arab conquest of Iran and its aftermath". The Cambridge History of Iran, Volume 4: From the Arab Invasion to the Saljuqs. Cambridge: Cambridge University Press. pp. 1–57. ISBN 978-0-521-20093-6.
- Morony, Michael G. (2005) [1984]. Iraq After The Muslim Conquest. Gorgias Press LLC. ISBN 978-1-59333-315-7.
- Jalalipour, Saeid (2014). The Arab Conquest of Persia: The Khūzistān Province before and after the Muslims Triumph (PDF). Sasanika.
