= Majza'a ibn Thawr al-Sadusi =

Islamic leader from Khuzestan

Majza'a ibn Thawr as-Sadusi مجزأة بن ثور السدوسي
- Died: c. 641/642; Shushtar, Khuzestan Province Iran
- Relatives: Banu Sadus of Shayban (clan); Bakr ibn Wa'il (tribe); Harthamah ibn Abd al-Uzza (father)
- Military career
- Allegiance: Rashidun Caliphate
- Branch: Rashidun army
- Conflicts: Muslim conquest of Khuzestan; Siege of Shushtar †

Majzaʾa ibn Thawr al-Sadūsī (Arabic: مجزأة بن ثور السدوسي), was a Muslim army commander and a companion of the Prophet who hailed from the clan of Sadus, a branch of the Banu Shayban tribe. Majza'a was said have attended 80 military battles during his life. He died during the Siege of Shushtar (641/642), in a battle with the Sassanian commander Hormuzan, although other sources reported that he was slain during the campaign in Basra.

== Biography ==
Little is known about Mujaz'ah's early life.

Mujaz'ah participated in the Muslim conquest of Persia. Under the command of the Rashidun army, Utbah ibn Ghazwan and Arfajah ibn Harthama captured the port city al-Ubulla (Iraq). After subduing this city, Utbah was instructed by the caliph Umar ibn al-Khattab to build a permanent settlement for his soldiers. In order to accomplish this, Utbah delegated Arfajah and Mujaz'ah to construct seven tribal complexes which could fit the 700 garrison troops. Then Arfajah instructed to build houses of mud bricks, plaster and mud to replace the camps. When these buildings were ready, Arfajah, Mujazah, and Arfajah's fellow tribesman Hudhayfah ibn Muhsin undertook the work of attracting to the new complex members of the Azd, of the Banu Tamim, and of Mujaz'ah's own tribe, the Banu Shayban.

=== Siege of Shushtar ===
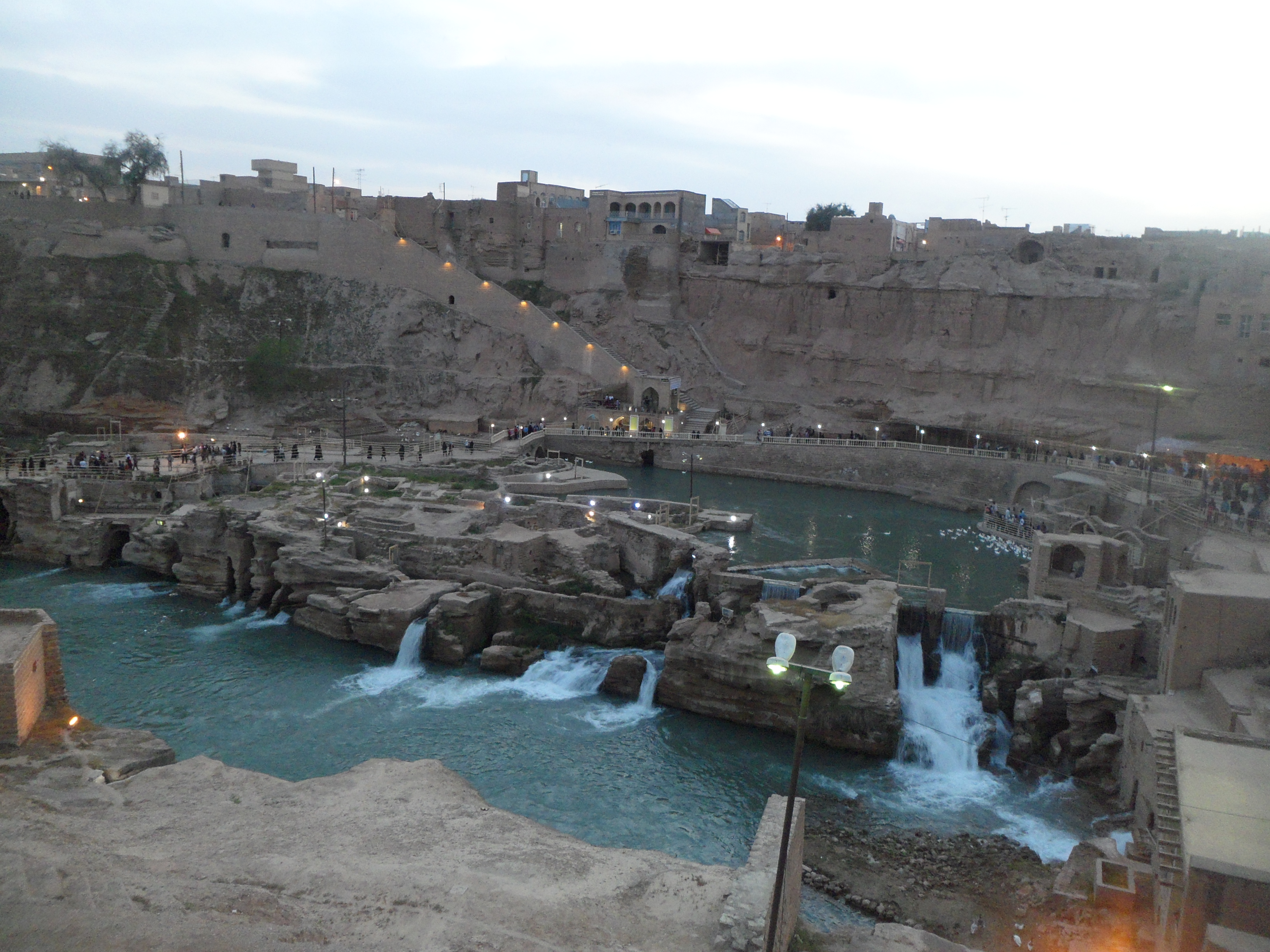
Shushtar, the place where Majza'ah has fallen on the battle

Later Mujaz'ah participated, along with Arfajah, in the conquest of Khuzestan. The caliph Umar issued an order to the Rashidun commander in Iraq, Abu Musa al-Ash'ari, to head to Ahvas (Khuzestan) in order to track down the Sassanian commander Hormuzan, who had fled from Ramhormoz toward Shushtar.

After Abu Musa had besieged the city of Shustar for almost one year, someone informed him that there was a waterway under the city walls, which lead into the city. Mujaz'ah volunteered to test whether it was possible to use the waterway to infiltrate the city, by swimming through it into the city. then Majza'ah accompanying the Persian turncoat towards the underground secret passage, which he found were true.

As he felt satisfied that the information given to Abu Musa was correct, Mujaz'ah returned to report to Abu Musa about how he had used the waterway to enter the city undetected. Abu Musa immediately sent a small team of 35, led by al-Bara' ibn Malik and Mujaz'ah, to infiltrate the city through the waterway, and to open the city gates from the inside. According to the Syrian historian Khayr al-Din al-Zirikli, Mujaz'ah and his team infiltrated though the waterway "swimming like ducks and crawling on it" before they climbed the wall. When all 35 of them had entered the city, al-Bara' and Mujaz'ah immediately rushed towards the city gate, killing everyone on their way while shouting the Takbir. It is said by Ibn Manda that both Mujaz'ah and al-Bara' slayed at least 100 Persian soldiers each during this battle. Then, as the team had reached the gate, they immediately opened it, thus allowing the Muslim army under Abu Musa to enter the city.

The Persian garrison was routed, and many of them were slain, as Hormuzan was cornered. However, during their effort to capture Hormuzan, the Persian noble was able to kill both Mujaz'ah and al-Bara'.

According to a number of other historical sources, such as Ibn Abi Hatim al-Razi, al-Bukhari, and Ibn Hibban, Mujaz'ah was killed during an earlier campaign in the area that is now known as Basra.

== See also ==
- Rashidun army
- Amsar
- Sa'd ibn Abi Waqqas
