= Islamic military jurisprudence =

Islamic laws of war

Islamic military jurisprudence refers to what has been accepted in Sharia (Islamic law) and Fiqh (Islamic jurisprudence) by Ulama (Islamic scholars) as the correct Islamic manner, expected to be obeyed by Muslims, in times of war. Some scholars and Muslim religious figures describe armed struggle based on Islamic principles as the lesser jihad.

== Development of rulings ==
The first military rulings were formulated during the first century after Muhammad established an Islamic state in Medina. These rulings evolved in accordance with the interpretations of the Qur'an (the Islamic Holy scriptures) and Hadith (the recorded traditions, actions (behaviors), sayings and consents of Muhammad). The key themes in these rulings were the justness of war (Harb), and the injunction to jihad. The rulings do not cover feuds and armed conflicts in general.

Jihad (Arabic for "struggle") was given a military dimension after the oppressive practices of the Meccan Quraish against Muslims. It was interpreted as the struggle in God's cause to be conducted by the Muslim community. Injunctions relating to jihad have been characterized as individual as well as collective duties of the Muslim community. Hence, the nature of attack is important in the interpretation—if the Muslim community as a whole is attacked jihad becomes incumbent on all Muslims. Jihad is differentiated further in respect to the requirements within Muslim-governed lands (Dar al-Islam) and non-Muslim lands, both friendly and hostile.

According to Shaheen Sardar Ali and Javaid Rehman, both professors of law, the Islamic military jurisprudence are in line with rules of modern international law. They point to the dual commitment of Organisation of Islamic Cooperation (OIC) member states (representing most of the Muslim world) to Islamic law and the United Nations Charter, as evidence of compatibility of both legal systems.

== Ethics of warfare ==
Fighting is justified for legitimate self-defense, to aid other Muslims and after a violation in the terms of a treaty, but should be stopped if these circumstances cease to exist. War should be conducted in a disciplined way, to avoid injuring non-combatants, with the minimum necessary force, without anger and with humane treatment towards prisoners of war.

During his life, Muhammad gave various injunctions to his forces and adopted practices toward the conduct of war. The most important of these were summarized by Muhammad's companion and first Caliph, Abu Bakr, in the form of ten rules for the Muslim army:

O people! I charge you with ten rules; learn them well! Stop, O people, that I may give you ten rules for your guidance in the battlefield. Do not commit treachery or deviate from the right path. You must not mutilate dead bodies. Neither kill a child, nor a woman, nor an aged man. Bring no harm to the trees, nor burn them with fire, especially those which are fruitful. Slay not any of the enemy's flock, save for your food. You are likely to pass by people who have devoted their lives to monastic services; leave them alone.

According to Tabari, the ten bits of "advice" that Abu Bakr gave was during the Expedition of Usama bin Zayd. During the Battle of Siffin, the Caliph Ali stated that Islam does not permit Muslims to stop the supply of water to their enemy. In addition to the Rashidun Caliphs, hadiths attributed to Muhammad himself suggest that he stated the following regarding the Muslim conquest of Egypt that eventually took place after his death:

You are going to enter Egypt a land where qirat (money unit) is used. Be extremely good to them as they have with us close ties and marriage relationships. When you enter Egypt after my death, recruit many soldiers from among the Egyptians because they are the best soldiers on earth, as they and their wives are permanently on duty until the Day of Resurrection. Be good to the Copts of Egypt; you shall take them over, but they shall be your instrument and help. Be Righteous to God about the Copts.

These principles were upheld by 'Amr ibn al-'As during his conquest of Egypt. A Christian contemporary in the 7th century, John of Nikiû, stated the following regarding the conquest of Alexandria by 'Amr:

On the twentieth of Maskaram, Theodore and all his troops and officers set out and proceeded to the island of Cyprus, and abandoned the city of Alexandria. And thereupon 'Amr the chief of the Moslem made his entry without effort into the city of Alexandria. And the inhabitants received him with respect; for they were in great tribulation and affliction. And Abba Benjamin, the patriarch of the Egyptians, returned to the city of Alexandria in the thirteenth year after his flight from the Romans, and he went to the Churches, and inspected all of them. And every one said: 'This expulsion (of the Romans) and victory of the Moslem is due to the wickedness of the emperor Heraclius and his persecution of the Orthodox through the patriarch Cyrus. This was the cause of the ruin of the Romans and the subjugation of Egypt by the Moslem. And 'Amr became stronger every day in every field of his activity. And he exacted the taxes which had been determined upon, but he took none of the property of the Churches, and he committed no act of spoliation or plunder, and he preserved them throughout all his days.

The principles established by the early Caliphs were also honoured during the Crusades, as exemplified by Sultans such as Saladin and Al-Kamil. For example, after Al-Kamil defeated the Franks during the Crusades, Oliverus Scholasticus praised the Islamic laws of war, commenting on how Al-Kamil supplied the defeated Frankish army with food:

Who could doubt that such goodness, friendship and charity come from God? Men whose parents, sons and daughters, brothers and sisters, had died in agony at our hands, whose lands we took, whom we drove naked from their homes, revived us with their own food when we were dying of hunger and showered us with kindness even when we were in their power.

The early Islamic treatises on international law from the 9th century onwards covered the application of Islamic ethics, Islamic economic jurisprudence and Islamic military jurisprudence to international law, and were concerned with a number of modern international law topics, including the law of treaties; the treatment of diplomats, hostages, refugees and prisoners of war; the right of asylum; conduct on the battlefield; protection of women, children and non-combatant civilians; contracts across the lines of battle; the use of poisonous weapons; and devastation of enemy territory.

== Criteria for soldiering ==
Muslim jurists agree that Muslim armed forces must consist of debt-free adults who possess a sound mind and body. In addition, the combatants must not be conscripted, but rather enlist of their free will, and with the permission of their family.

== Legitimacy of war ==
Muslims have struggled to differentiate between legitimate and illegitimate wars. Fighting in self-defense is not only legitimate but considered obligatory upon Muslims, according to the Qur'an. The Qur'an, however, says that should the enemy's hostile behavior cease, then the reason for engaging the enemy also lapses.

=== Defensive conflict ===
According to the majority of jurists, the Qur'anic casus belli (justification of war) are restricted to aggression against Muslims and fitna—persecution of Muslims because of their religious belief. They hold that unbelief in itself is not the justification for war. These jurists therefore maintain that only combatants are to be fought; noncombatants such as women, children, clergy, the aged, the insane, farmers, serfs, the blind, and so on are not to be killed in war. Thus, the Hanafī Ibn Najīm states: "the reason for jihād in our [the Hanafīs] view is kawnuhum harbā ‛alaynā [literally, their being at war against us]." The Hanafī jurists al-Shaybānī and al-Sarakhsī state that "although kufr [unbelief in God] is one of the greatest sins, it is between the individual and his God the Almighty and the punishment for this sin is to be postponed to the dār al-jazā’, (the abode of reckoning, the Hereafter)." War, according to the Hanafis, can't simply be made on the account of a nation's religion. Abdulaziz Sachedina argues that the original jihad according to his version of Shi'ism was permission to fight back against those who broke their pledges. Thus the Qur'an justified defensive jihad by allowing Muslims to fight back against hostile and dangerous forces.

=== Offensive conflict ===
Muhammad ibn Idris ash-Shafi`i (d. 820), founder of the Shafi'i school of thought, was the first to permit offensive jihad, limiting this warfare against pagan Arabs only, not permitting it against non-Arab non-Muslims. This view of al-Shafi'i is mitigated by the fact that an opposite view, in agreement with the majority, is also attributed to al-Shafi'i.

According to Abdulaziz Sachedina, offensive jihad raises questions about whether jihad is justifiable on moral grounds. He states that the Qur'an requires Muslims to establish just public order, increasing the influence of Islam, allowing public Islamic worship, through offensive measures. To this end, the Qur'anic verses revealed required Muslims to wage jihad against unbelievers who persecuted them. This has been complicated by the early Muslim conquests, which he argues were although considered jihad by Sunni scholars, but under close scrutiny can be determined to be political. Moreover, the offensive jihad points more to the complex relationship with the "People of the book".

Some major modern scholars who have rejected the idea of "offensive jihad" include the founder of the Muslim Brotherhood, Hasan al-Banna (1906–1949), the Al-Azhar scholar Muhammad Abu Zahra (1898–1974) who thought that "military jihad is permitted only to remove aggression ('udwân) and religious persecution (fitnah) against Muslims", as well as Syrian scholars Mohamed Said Ramadan Al-Bouti (1929–2013) and Wahbah al-Zuhayli (1932-2015), the latter saying that "peace is the underlying principle of relations between Muslims and non-Muslims. al-Zuhayli maintains that this view is supported by 8:61, as well as 2:208 and 4:94 that establish the principle of international peace. For him, Muslims should be committed to peace and security (on the basis of 4:90 and 60:8)."

== International conflict ==
International conflicts are armed strifes conducted by one state against another, and are distinguished from civil wars or armed strife within a state. Some classical Islamic scholars, like the Shafi'i, classified territories into broad categories: dar al-islam ("abode of Islam"), dar al-harb ("abode of war), dar al-ahd ("abode of treaty"), and dar al-sulh ("abode of reconciliation"). Such categorizations of states, according to Asma Afsaruddin, are not mentioned in the Qur'an and Islamic tradition.

=== Declaration of war ===
The Qur'an commands Muslims to make a proper declaration of war prior to the commencement of military operations. Thus, surprise attacks prior to such a declaration are illegal under the Islamic jurisprudence. The Qur'an had similarly commanded Muhammad to give his enemies, who had violated the Treaty of Hudaybiyyah, a time period of four months to reconsider their position and negotiate. This rule, however, is not binding if the adversary has already started the war. Forcible prevention of religious practice is considered an act of war.

=== Conduct of armed forces ===
During battle the Qur'an commands Muslims to fight against the enemy. However, there are restrictions to such combat. Burning or drowning the enemy is allowed only if it is impossible to achieve victory by other means. The mutilation of dead bodies is prohibited. The Qur'an also discourages Muslim combatants from displaying pomp and unnecessary boasting when setting out for battle.

According to professor Sayyid Dāmād, no explicit injunctions against use of chemical or biological warfare were developed by medieval Islamic jurists as these threats were not existent then. However, Khalil al-Maliki's Book on jihad states that combatants are forbidden to employ weapons that cause unnecessary injury to the enemy, except under dire circumstances. The book, as an example, forbids the use of poisonous spears, since it inflicts unnecessary pain.

==== Civilian areas ====
According to all madhhabs, it is not permissible to kill women or children unless they are fighting against the Muslims. The Hanafi, Hanbali and Maliki schools forbid killing of those who are not able to fight, including monks, farmers, and serfs, as well as mentally and physically disabled.

Harming civilian areas and pillaging residential areas is also forbidden, as is the destruction of trees, crops, livestock and farmlands. The Muslim forces may not loot travelers, as doing so is contrary to the spirit of jihad. Nor do they have the right to use the local facilities of the native people without their consent. If such a consent is obtained, the Muslim army is still under the obligation to compensate the people financially for the use of such facilities. However, Islamic law allows the confiscation of military equipment and supplies captured from the camps and military headquarters of the combatant armies.

However, 14th century Fiqih Ibn Hudayl of Granada says:

It is permissible to set fire to the lands of the enemy, his stores of grain, his beasts of burden—if it is not possible for the Muslims to take possession of them—as well as to cut down his trees, to raze his cities, in a word, to do everything that might ruin and discourage him, provided that the imam deems these measures appropriate, suited to hastening the Islamization of that enemy or to weakening him. Indeed, all this contributes to a military triumph over him or to forcing him to capitulate.

=== Negotiations ===
Commentators of the Qur'an agree that Muslims should always be willing and ready to negotiate peace with the other party without any hesitation. According to Maududi, Islam does not permit Muslims to reject peace and continue bloodshed.

Islamic jurisprudence calls for third party interventions as another means of ending conflicts. Such interventions are to establish mediation between the two parties to achieve a just resolution of the dispute.

=== Ceasefire ===
In the context of seventh century Arabia, the Qur'an ordained Muslims must restrain themselves from fighting in the months when fighting was prohibited by Arab pagans. The Qur'an also required the respect of this cease-fire, prohibiting its violation.

If, however, non-Muslims commit acts of aggression, Muslims are free to retaliate, though in a manner that is equal to the original transgression. The "sword verse", which has attracted attention, is directed against a particular group who violate the terms of peace and commit aggression (but excepts those who observe the treaty). Patricia Crone states that this verse seems to be based on the same above-mentioned rules. Here also it is stressed that one must stop when they do. Ibn Kathir states that the verse implies a hasty mission of besieging and gathering intelligence about the enemy, resulting in either death or repentance by the enemy. It is read as a continuation of previous verses, it would be concerned with the same oath-breaking of "polytheists".

=== Prisoners of war ===
Men, women, and children may all be taken as prisoners of war under traditional interpretations of Islamic law. Generally, a prisoner of war could be, at the discretion of the military leader, executed, freed, ransomed, exchanged for Muslim prisoners, or kept as slaves. In earlier times, the ransom sometimes took an educational dimension, where a literate prisoner of war could secure his or her freedom by teaching ten Muslims to read and write. Some Muslim scholars hold that a prisoner may not be ransomed for gold or silver, but may be exchanged for Muslim prisoners. Women and children prisoners of war cannot be killed under any circumstances, regardless of their religious convictions, but they may be freed or ransomed. Women who are neither freed nor ransomed by their people were to be kept in bondage - also referred to as malakah.

Kitab al-Umm of Al-Shafi'i also recorded how Zubayr ibn al-Awwam and Anas ibn Malik convinced Umar to pardon Hormuzan, despite Umar earlier intent to execute the Persian general for the death of his two precious soldiers, Mujaz'ah ibn Thawr as-Sadusi and al-Bara' ibn Malik. Umar in the end agreed with Zubayr and Anas to spare Hormuzan as prisoner of war, and this historical rulings of Zubayr, Anas, and caliph Umar became the guideline for Shafiite scholars that prisoner of war in normal condition are not allowed to be harmed.

==== Permission to interrogate & torture ====
However, there are special condition regarding the allowance and conduct of using torture as method of interrogation,

- Ibn Taymiyyah, Hanbalite scholar who has been praised as Mujaddid, has issued Fatwa that using torture on certain case for exceptionally dangerous criminal or enemy of the state were allowed, which based on the conduct of Zubayr ibn al-Awwam, when he tortured the Jewish chieftain Kenana ibn al-Rabi in the aftermath of the conquest of Khaybar fortresses, as Kenana was hiding the war spoils in Khaibar and refused to tell it. Abd al-Aziz Bin Baz, late 19th AD Grand Mufti of Saudi also supported Ibn Taymiyyah fatwa and issued his own fatwa with similar ruling on the basis Zubayr conduct of interrogating Kenana. Ibn Baz highlighted Zubayr conduct were acknowledged and permitted by Muhammad, as Kenana was one of Jewish conspirator in Khaybar. This criminal interrogation procedure exacted by Zubayr towards Kinana were also highlighted by other prominent scholars, such as Ahmad ibn Muhammad al-Thalabi in his work, Tafsir al-Tha'labi
- Shafiʽi school madhhab highlighted another case that were used in Ijma (consensus among scholars) to permit the interrogations towards enemy of the state were including the case when Ali ibn Abi Talib and Zubayr once threaten a polytheist informant spy who are being caught by the 2 Sahabah during the spy journey to inform Mecca about Muslims secret military operation.

This ruling of torturing testified and accepted by Islamic researcher as particular affirmative proposition in certain case against war criminal, which modern time Islamic jurisprudence law theorists agreed on by viewing the measure as the necessity of law upholding, rather than degradation of the rights of the prisoner as human.

== Internal conflict ==
Internal conflicts include "civil wars", launched against rebels, and "wars for welfare" launched against bandits.

During their first civil war, Muslims fought at the Battle of Basra. In this engagement, Ali (the caliph), set the precedent for war against other Muslims, which most later Muslims have accepted. According to Ali's rules, wounded or captured enemies should not be killed, those throwing away their arms should not be fought, and those fleeing from the battleground should not be pursued. Only captured weapons and animals (horses and camels which have been used in the war) are to be considered war booty. No war prisoners, women or children are to be enslaved and the property of the slain enemies are to go to their legal Muslim heirs.

Different views regarding armed rebellion have prevailed in the Muslim world at different times. During the first three centuries of Muslim history, jurists held that a political rebel may not be executed nor his/her property confiscated.

Classical jurists, however, laid down severe penalties for rebels who use "stealth attacks" and "spread terror". In this category, Muslim jurists included abductions, poisoning of water wells, arson, attacks against wayfarers and travellers, assaults under the cover of night and rape. The punishment for such crimes were severe, including death, regardless of the political convictions and religion of the perpetrator.

== See also ==
- Islam and war
- Geneva Conventions
- Hague conventions
- Rule of Law in Armed Conflicts Project (RULAC)
- Itmam al-Hujjah
- Law of war
- Islamic Military Counter Terrorism Coalition
