= Muslim warfare =

Muslim warfare may refer to

- Early Muslim conquests
- Holy war in Islam
- Jihad
- Islamic military jurisprudence
- Medieval Muslim treatises on military arts, see Furusiyya
