= Shiruya al-Uswari =

Shiruya al-Uswari (Arabic: شيروية الأسواري, in Middle Persian: Shērōē) was an Iranian nobleman, who was part of the Sasanian asvaran unit, but later defected together with a faction of the unit to the Rashidun Caliphate, where the unit became known as the Asawira. He settled in Basra, and married a Sasanian princess called Marjana (or Manjana), whom he built a palace for on a canal in Basra

== Sources ==
- Bosworth, C. E. (1987). "ASĀWERA". Encyclopaedia Iranica, Vol. II, Fasc. 7. pp. 706–707.
- Morony, Michael G. (2005) [1984]. Iraq After The Muslim Conquest. Gorgias Press LLC. ISBN 978-1-59333-315-7.
- Zakeri, Mohsen (1995). Sasanid Soldiers in Early Muslim Society: The Origins of 'Ayyārān and Futuwwa. Otto Harrassowitz Verlag. pp. 1–391. ISBN 3447036524.
