= Al-Bara' ibn Malik =

Companion of Muhammad (died c.641)

al-Bara' ibn Malik البراء بن مالك al-Ansari
- Born: Medina, Hejaz, Arabia (present-day Saudi Arabia)
- Died: 641/642; Shushtar, Khuzestan, Sasanian Empire
- Burial place: Khuzestan
- Other name: Ibn Malik
- Employer(s): Muhammad, Abu Bakar, Umar
- Organization: Rashidun caliphate
- Known for: Companion of the Prophet; Transmitter of Hadiths; Pledge of the Tree; Campaigns under Muhammad; Battle of Uhud; Battle of the trench; Battle of Hunayn; Ridda Wars; Battle of Yamama; Muslim conquest of Persia; Battle of Darin Island; Battle of al-Qadisiyyah; Muslim conquest of Khuzestan; Battle of the bridge of Susa; Siege of Shushtar
- Parents: Malik ibn Nadr (father); Umm Sulaym (mother)
- Relatives: Anas ibn Malik (brother); Zaid ibn Malik (brother); Abdullah ibn Abi Talha (step-brother); Abu Talha al-Ansari (step-father)
- Family: Banu Najjar branch of Banu Khazraj (clan); Azd (tribe)

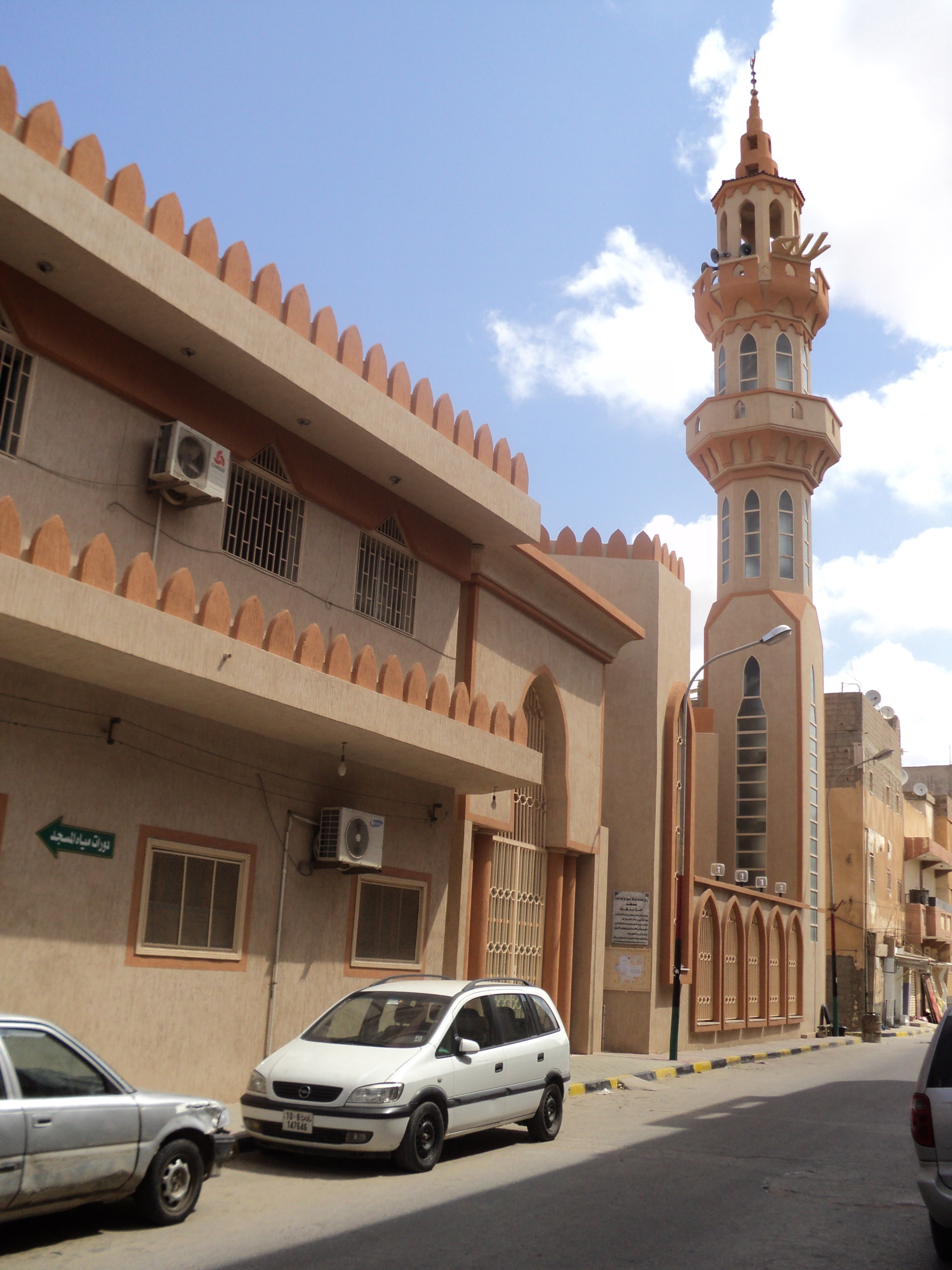
al-Baraa' ibn Malik Mosque in Benghazi, Libya

Al-Barāʾ ibn Mālik al-Anṣārī (Arabic: البراء بن مالك الأنصاري; died c. 641) was one of the Sahaba (companions of Muhammad), an Ansar belonging to the Banū al-Najjār branch of the Banu Khazraj. He was the brother of Anas ibn Malik.

He was most known for his participations in the Ridda Wars against Musaylima and Muslim conquest of Persia. He died around 641-642 of wounds he received during his siege in Shushtar against the Sasanian Empire.

Al-Barā has become a role model of conducting Jihad by later era Islamic communities.

== Biography ==
Al-Bara' was from Banu Ghanm clan, a sub-branch of Banū al-Najjār branch belonging to the Banu Khazraj tribe. Al-Dhahabi recorded that his full Nisba (onomastics) lineage is Al-Barā son of Malik from the subclan of Al-Nadir ibn Damdam ibn Yazid ibn Haram ibn Jundub ibn 'Amr ibn Ghanam ibn 'Adi of the Banu Najjar.

After Muhammad migrated to Medina, al-Baraa' worked as a camel chanter and lead of men's caravan of camels whenever Muhammad and his companions goes for military expedition.

Al-Bara' was said to participate in all campaigns under Muhammad, starting from the Battle of Uhud. During the battle of the Trench, al-Barāʾ reported on his own account when he dug out the trench outside the city along with Muhammad and other Medinese. Al-Barā' also participated in the pledge of the Tree during the first pilgrimage. During the battle of Hunayn, Al-Barā' was given Khums or a fifth portion of the goods looted from enemies he killed personally.

=== Ridda wars ===
Following the death of Muhammad, the Muslims began to leave Islam in groups just as they had entered it. Caliph Abu Bakr dispatched eleven armies to fight the leaders of these groups in what became known as the Ridda wars.

During the Battle of Yamama, al-Baraa' played a role when the rebels army under Musailamah Al Kadhab and his 40,000 soldiers from Banu Hanifa fortified themselves in the fortress named Garden of Death, Ikrima ibn Abi Jahl and Khalid ibn al-Walid struggled to break through the high walls of the garden until al-Baraa' suggested they place him on a shield and using spears and catapults al-Baraa' into the fortress wall. The Muslims agreed with al-Baraa's plan and al-Baraa' immediately fell into the fortress as intended, killing many town guards on the wall and fortress gate inside singlehandedly and rushed towards the gate and open it alone from inside, allowing Muslim forces under Khalid ibn al Walid to swarm inside and killed 20,000 of the ex-Muslims, including their leader Musailama, killed by Wahshi and Abu Dujana al Ansari. During this battle, Ibn Hajar also noted a testimony of Al-Barā' himself that he engaged in a duel against a huge Musaylamah warrior nicknamed Himar al Yamama (donkey of Yamama). Al-Bara managed to cut both of his opponent feet with his sword, and caused him dropped to the ground, Then al-Bara grab the man's sword and finishing him by using his own sword.

Despite suffering grave injuries which numbered over 80 wounds, al-Baraa' managed to survive in the aftermath of the Yamama battle. (Note: eighty-one wounds according to Khalifah ibn Khayyat, Ibn Hajar and al Dhahabi on their recorded narratives.) After the battle, Khalid ibn al Walid was said to personally visit his tents where he still treating his wound and rest.

=== Conquest of Persia ===
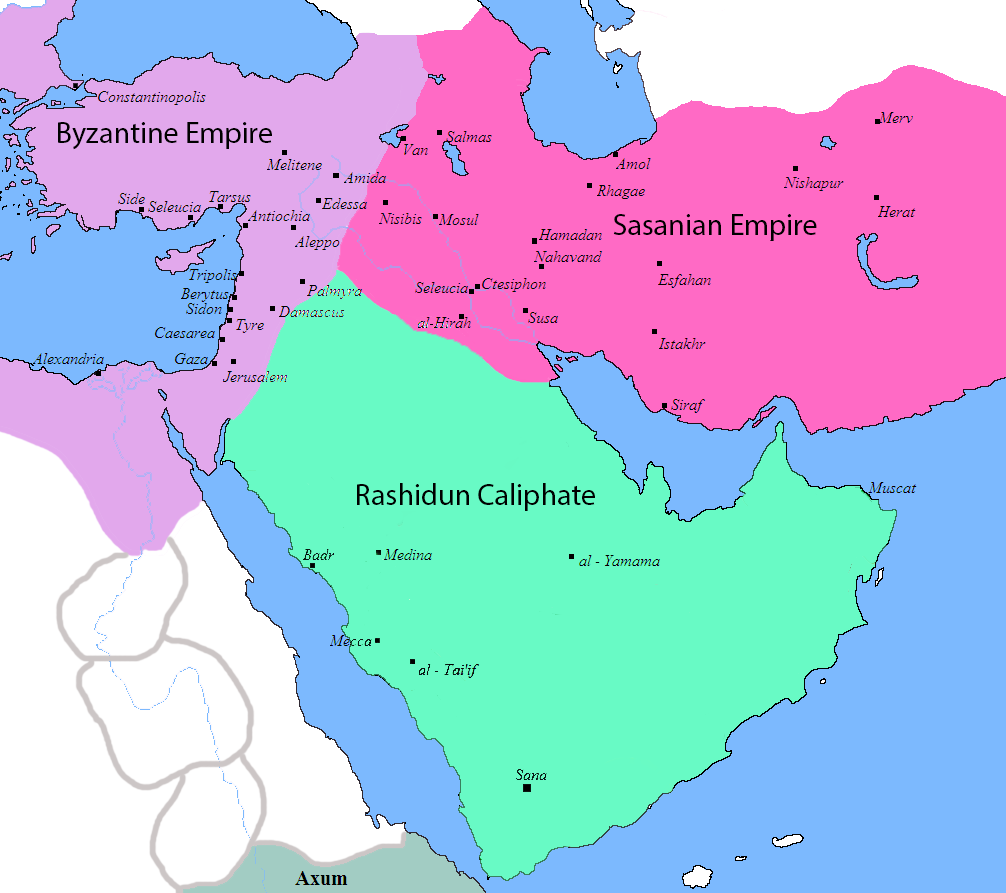
Map of the Sassanid, Byzantine and Muslim borders..

On the onset of early naval incursion against Persia which started from Oman, al-Baraa' participated the naval expedition embarked from Bahrain led by Al-Ala al-Hadhrami and Arfaja al-Bariqi to expel Sasanian Empire forces in the Island of Darin (Qatif). In the final battle of this island in the fortress of Zarah, al-Baraa' killed the Persian Marzban commander of the area in duel, and managed to seize the wealth of the said commander of 30,000 coins after the battle. (Note: According to Baladhuri, 40,000 coin.) However, caliph 'Umar saw that it was too much for single person to acquire spoils of war that huge, so the Caliph decided that Al-Barā' should be given a four portions after it being divided into five, with one portion sent for the caliphate treasury.

Later, during the Muslim conquest of Persia, Al-Barā' participated in the battle of al-Qadisiyyah, where he was urged by other soldiers to pray for victory in this difficult battle, since the Muslim soldiers in that battle believed if al-Baraa' prayed, his wishes would always be granted by Allah. (Note: Al-Mustadrak ala al-Sahihayn, 606/3. al-Hakim al-Nishapuri and Al-Dhahabi deemed the narration is trustworthy according to Sahih Muslim criterion. Abu Nu'aym al-Isfahani also said this record is authentic in his work, Dalail un nabuwat, 369/1. Al-Haytham also reported similar record in his work Majmu, 369/9. Musnad al-Bazzar and Al-Tabarani also record this with trustworthy narrators.)

During Muslim conquest of Khuzestan, The highest commander of Muslim army, Abu Musa al-Ash'ari requested to the caliph to provide him with elite guards from Ansar (military) component, which was replied by Umar by sending a group of Ansaris including Al-Barā' ibn Malik along with his brother, Anas. In the campaign on Khuzestan, the Muslims faced a particularly difficult battle on the bridge of Susa, eastern of Tigris river, as the enemy gained upper hand at the first of the battle. Thus the Muslims soldiers once again came to Al-Barā' asking for prayer, and after Al-Barā' finished his prayer, the Muslims fight again until they managed to gained upper hand and seized victory.

Later, during the Siege of Shushtar, al-Baraa' once again gave important contribution as he and Mujaz'ah ibn Thawr as-Sadusi lead a small team of 35 soldiers to sneak from the waterway under the fortress wall, which has been besieged for almost one year. They killed many guards on the city gate before opened the gate and allowed the Muslims army under Abu Musa al-Ash'ari storm the city and subdue the town. According to his own word that has been recorded in Siyar A'lam Nubala chronicle written by Al-Dhahabi and in Usd al-ghabah fi marifat al-Saḥabah chronicle which written by Ibn al-Athir, Al-Barā' ibn Malik singlehandedly slayed at least 100 Sassanid soldiers during this battle alone. (Note: This claim come from Al-Barā' testimony which narration are recorded in Al-Baghawi and commented by Al-Tabarani. Nur al-Din al-Haythami also narrating this from al-Bara brother, Anas. This was deemed authentic by Al-Hakim al-Nishapuri.) (Note: Tabari recorded during this battle, other Muslim warriors such as Majza'ah ibn Thawr, Ka'b ibn Sur, and Abu Tamimah also reported marked similar kill counts with Al-Barā'.)

=== Death ===
Muslim chroniclers recorded two versions regarding when Al-Barā' fallen on the battle:

- According to Ibn Hajar al-Asqalani version, his death occurred during the Siege of Shushtar in Persia, but only after he rescued his brother Anas from the molten hooks, which caused he suffered grief injury to the point that his own palms melted and showing the bones in his effort to break the chain from Anas, al-Baraa' succumbed to the wound shortly after Anas were rescued.
- Meanwhile, Malik ibn Anas, Tabari, Bukhari, Ibn Hibban, and Ibn Manda reported the second version that al-Baraa' was fallen indeed in siege of Shushtar, but not by the molten steel hook of Sassanid army, instead he died at the hand of Hormuzan in this battle. al-Dhahabi favored this version as he deemed this authentic, which also narrated by al-Bayhaqi. Al-Dhahabi also add note that al-Barā' was twenty years old during his death.

Ahmad Abd ar-Razaq al-Khani, researcher from Damascus University; explained the two narratives were actually correlated, as al-Barā' actually survived the first occasion during the incident with chained molten hooks, where he rested for while after the injuries, until he participated in the final storming of Shushtar, where he was fallen in combat against Hormuzan.

== Character assessment ==
"...Are you afraid, i will die in my bed [instead on the battlefield, after i] have killed ninety-nine polytheists in duels? apart from [any battles,] the Muslims has fought?..."

al Bara' ibn Malik to Anas ibn Malik. (Note: Al-Hakim al-Nishapuri said that Hammad ibn Salamah said that al-Barā' killed 92 instead of 99.)

Chroniclers say al-Baraa' was thin and was extremely brave on the battlefield. Caliph Umar ibn al Khattab told his generals never to give al-Baraa' any command position, as his reckless bravery would expose his own soldiers to danger. Umar valued his military ability, according to modern writer Khalid Muhammad Khalid who said in his book, Rijala Hawla Rasulullah Shalallahu 'Alaihi Wassalam, that during the Muslim conquest of Khuzestan, when Suhayl ibn Adiyy was sent by Abu Musa al-Ash'ari to invade Ahwaz, Umar specifically instructed Abu Musa to include al-Barā' in the Suhayl invading force.

Anas ibn Malik said that al-Barā' had a beautiful voice and loved reciting poems frequently, until Anas persuade his brother to recite Qur'an instead of poetry.

=== Ascetism ===
Chroniclers said that Muhammad once praised al-Baraa' as a pious figure whose prayers would always be answered by God, despite his low social status. (Note: Recorded in Al-Mustadrak ala al-Sahihayn and Sunan al-Tirmidhi. The text of Tirmidhi were traced from the authority of Anas ibn Malik and deemed as authentic by Al-Albani. Another records with the same author Anas ibn Malik came from Musnad al-Bazzar, which deemed authentic by later era Hadith scholar Sadr Al-Din Al-Manawi in his work, Kashf al-Manahij Wa al-Tanaqih; and Al-Jami' al-Saghir record by Al-Suyuti on the authority of Abu Hurayra, which deemed authentic by modern Hadith scholars association, Al-Durar Al Sunniyyah Foundation.)

The Rashidun army during the Muslim conquest of Persia apparently held high opinion for al-Barā' and believed that his supplication will always come true, as when they asked specifically to al-Barā' for the success of the battle in Qadisiyya. The second occasion of this was during the battle of the bridge of Susa in Iran, the Muslim soldiers came to al-Barā' to seek his prayer to win the battle. The third recorded occasion were when his colleagues once again asked him to pray for victory during the siege of Shushtar fortress. However, aside from praying for victory, al-Barā' also praying for being killed in battle as martyr during this siege.

== Legacy ==
=== Scholar analysis ===
Al-Barā' is viewed highly in the Islamic scholarly community in general, as Companions of the Prophet, collectively named al-salaf al-ṣāliḥ (pious ancestors), they are regarded as their as daily religious role model. This view was outlined by Ibn Taymiyyah, both in their figure as a guideline and in practicing Islamic religious observances. Ibn Taymiyyah further observes the special rank within the Companions from the Ansar, which are according to him, vital for the faith, as he quoted the hadith, "love for the Ansar is a sign of Iman, while hatred against them is a sign of hypocrisy".

==== Spoils of war ====
Scholars of Islamic Fiqh jurisprudence have taken notes regarding case of al-Barā' when he managed to seize massive amount of a spoils of war during the battle in Darin island, after he managed to subdue Sassanid fortress and killing the commander, which immediately ruled by Umar the spoils from the enemy which obtained by al-Barā' should be divided by five, whereas four portions be given to al-Bara, while one portion are separated to be combined to the total amount spoils of the battle.

incident has discussed about the rulings in Sunni jurisprudence on the later era about how every single soldier has a right for a Khums, or four of a fifth portion of spoils of war, according to his performance deeds in the battlefield. Averroes from Maliki school of Jurisprudence remarked this record in his book Bidayat al Mujtahid Wa Nihayat al Muqtashid which he got from the tradition of Ibn Abi Shaybah and Ibn Sirin, that the case of al-Barā' divided share were the first case in Islam history, and has become guidelines by later jurists to measure the rights of soldiers regarding spoils of war. While Ibn Mawaz, another Maliki scholar, has denied this al-Barā' tradition regarding spoils of war, as he noted that the case of the distribution for al-Barā' in Hunayn was a special case, as he noted that Abu Bakr never distribute spoils of war in such fashion during his reign as caliph.

However, Izz al-Din ibn 'Abd al-Salam, a Shafiite scholar and Mamluk general in 12th AD century who led Baibars army against Louis IX of France crusaders and Ilkhanate Mongol, dismissed Ibn Mawaz's claim and has argued with another tradition that this practice has been done before as Muhammad during the battle of Hunayn, and Muhammad even gave the fifth spoils to al-Barā', the very same person who were given the fifth by Umar in Darin island battle.

==== Ruling of martyrdom ====
Since Madhhab Sahabi (opinion of the Companions of the Prophet) were accepted as one of the jurisprudence source in Islam, The historical act of al-Barā' to seek martyrdom in Jihad by plunging himself inside enemy castle in the Battle of Yamamah, where the enemy barricaded themselves, are translated by Islamist factions with Extremism view that the Terrorism act using Suicide attack with IED were allowed in modern analogy (Qiyas). Thus, leading some extremist movements such as Free Syrian Army, ISIS Kurdistan Ansar as Sunna Group, and Al-Qaeda in various regions to form a suicide squad which they named, in curiously similar theme, as "al-Bara Ibn Malik Martyrs' Brigade" in accordance to their apparent attempt to associate their acts with al Bara' in Yamama.

However, this view were rejected by contemporary Islamic scholars, particularly those in line with the view of Abdullah Ibn Jibreen, Abd al-Aziz Bin Baz and Muhammad ibn al-Uthaymeen, three of prominent Saudi Arabia Muftis and clerics, opined that the act of al-Baraa' cannot be analogized as an act suicide bombings particularly for three different reasons:

1. Method which done by al-Barā' were not determinantly suicide in nature, despite the high chance of fatality for such act.
2. The act of al-Baraa' were authorized by legal government which had de facto and de jure authority. in this case are the Rashidun Caliphate, which al-Baraa' owed his allegiance. While modern day terrorist organizations were non-state actors, which cannot burdened and bound with treaty, pact or responsibility.
3. The targets of modern-day terrorists are not in line with al-Bara aggression in Yamama, since al-Barā' were targeting legitimate hostile combatants on the battlefield, while non-state terrorists also targeting illegitimate subjects recklessly, such as fellow Muslim civilians and Dhimmi non-Muslims who are forbidden to be harassed in Islamic beliefs. Furthermore, the act of suicide bombing terrorism during modern day in Palestine were deemed by Ibn Uthaymeen not beneficial to Islam and it will only do harm to the Muslim communities in Palestine, and to the perpetrator of the act as the bombers were threaten with hellfire in the afterlife.

The Fatwa by Abdu al-Aziz ibn Baz were particularly aimed to deny the ruling from Yusuf al-Qaradawi who viewed that the Martyrdom act ofal-Barā' in battle and Ashabul Ukhdud in Yemen were viewed the same as suicide bombers in modern time.

Modern day Grand Mufti of Saudi Arabia, Sheikh Abdulaziz al-Sheikh, further strengthened his predecessors view by issuing Fatwa particularly disallow terrorism act of suicide bombing. Like the Salafi scholars before him, Abdulaziz al-Sheikh similarly saying suicide bombers does not represent the jurisprudential analogy with al-Barā' martyrdom, thus dismissing claim from proponents of modern-day practice of terrorism using suicide bombing as Jihad.

=== Institutions & landmarks ===
In 20th AD modern era, there are several places and institutes which named over al-Bara ibn Malik, such as Al Bara' Bin Malik Mixed Elementary School in Saudi Arabia. While in Qatar, al-Barā' ibn Malik were also used as street name.

== See also ==
- Sunni view of the Sahaba
- List of Sahabah
- Ridda wars
- Early Caliphate navy

== Online biography ==
"al-Bara' bin Malik (البراء بن مالك بن النضر (رضي الله عنه". muslimscholars.info (in English and Arabic).
