= Hormozan =

Hormozan (Persian: هرمزان) may refer to:

- Hormuzan, governor (satrap) of Susiana in 639

== See also ==
- Hormozgan
