= Muslim conquest of Khuzestan =

Part of the Muslim conquest of Persia

- Part of the Muslim conquest of Persia
- Map of Khuzestan and its surroundings
Date	637/8–642
Location	Khuzestan
Result	Muslim victory
Territorial changes	Khuzestan brought under Muslim rule

Belligerents
Rashidun Caliphate	Sasanian Empire

Commanders and leaders
Abu Musa al-Ash'ari; Al-Nu'man ibn Muqarrin; Arfajah ibn Harthama; Hurqus ibn Zuhayr; Siyah al-Uswari; Shiruya al-Uswari; Sulma ibn al-Qayn; Harmala ibn Muraytah	Hormuzan (POW); Siyah al-Uswari; Shiruya al-Uswari; Shahriyar (surrendered)

Casualties and losses
Heavy	Unknown, probably heavy

The Muslim conquest of Khuzestan, or the Arab conquest of Khuzestan, took place from 637/8 to 642 and resulted in the acquisition of the rich Khuzestan Province by the Rashidun Caliphate.

== History ==
=== Early Muslim incursions and the fall of Hormizd-Ardashir ===
The Arabs started invading Khuzestan in 637/8—around the same time when Hormuzan, a nobleman of high status, had arrived to Hormizd-Ardashir after suffering several defeats to the Arabs in Asoristan. Hormuzan used the city as a base to mount his raids in Meshan against the Arabs. The young Sasanian king Yazdegerd III (r. 632–651) supported him in these raids, and believed that it was possible to regain the territories which had been taken by the Arabs. After some time, Hormuzan clashed with an Arab army to the west of Hormizd-Ardashir, but was easily defeated and retreated back to the city, where he asked for peace. The Arabs agreed in return for tribute, which Hormuzan accepted. However, he soon stopped paying tribute, and raised an army of Kurds (a term then used to describe Iranian nomads). Umar, who was caliph of the Rashidun Caliphate, responded by sending an army under Hurqus ibn Zuhayr as-Sa'di, who defeated Hormuzan in 638 at Hormizd-Ardashir, and forced the city to pay jizya . Meanwhile, Hormuzan fled to Ram-Hormizd. He then once again sought a peace treaty and was granted one in return for tribute.

However, he once again stopped paying tribute and continued his resistance, but was again defeated in a battle. Meanwhile, the cities of Khuzestan were slowly one-by-one conquered. Sometime later in 641, after a defeat at Ram-Hormizd, Hormuzan fled to Shushtar, and was defeated near the city, which cost him the lives of 900 of his men, while 600 were captured and would later be executed. Nevertheless, he managed to reach the city. The Arabs then laid siege to the city.

=== The Siege of Shushtar ===
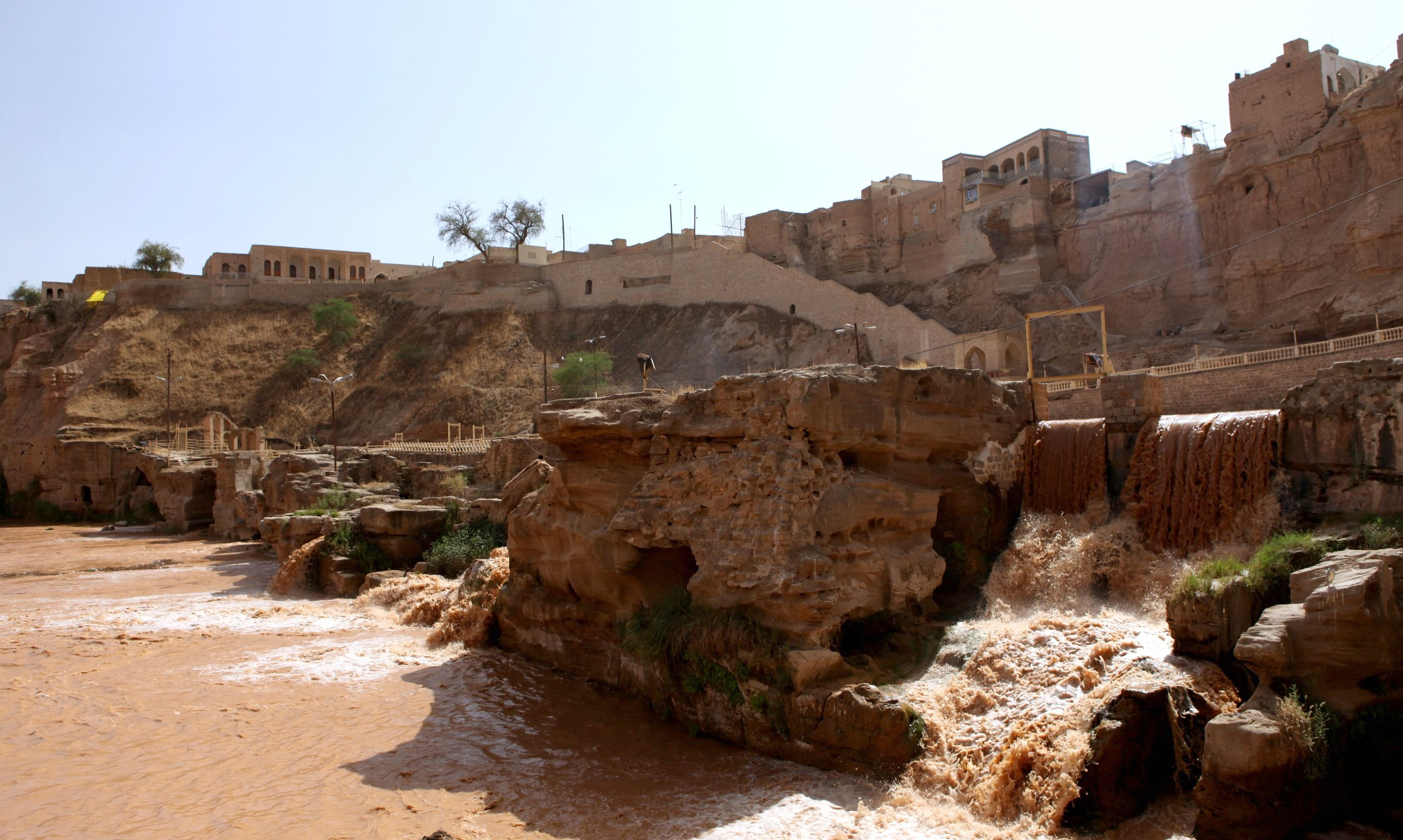
A water structure in Shushtar, created during the Sasanian era.

Fortunately for Hormuzan, Shushtar was well fortified due to the rivers and canals that surrounded it on almost all sides. One of them was known as Ardashiragan, named after the first Sasanian king Ardashir I (r. 224–240). Another known as Shamiram, named after the legendary Assyrian Queen Semiramis. The last one mentioned was known as Darayagan, named after the Achaemenid king Darius I (r. 550–486 BCE). There are several versions of how the city got captured; according to al-Tabari, during the siege, an Iranian defector named Sina (or Sinah) went to al-Nu'man and pleaded for his life to be spared in return for helping him how to show a way into the city. Al-Nu'man agreed, and Sina told him the following thing; "attack via the outlet of the water, and then you will conquer the city."

Al-Nu'man did as he told him, and with a small portion of his army, charged into Shushtar. Hormuzan then retreated to the citadel and continued his resistance, but was eventually forced to surrender. According to another version written in the Khuzestan Chronicle, similar to the version by al-Tabari, a defector from Qatar, along with another person, asked the Arabs for some of their plunder in exchange of how to enter the city. The Arabs agreed, and after some time, they managed to enter the city. According to al-Baladhuri, during the siege, the Arabs were reinforced with a group of professional Iranian elites under Siyah al-Uswari, known as the Asawira.

The reason for their defection was in order to preserve their status and wealth. However, according to the Khuzestan Chronicle, the Asawira first defected to the Arabs after they entered Shushtar. The brother of Hormuzan, Shahriyar, is said to have been a part of the Asawira. According to Pourshariati, the story of the Asawira helping the Arabs in their conquest of Khuzestan, may have been false. Hormuzan, after his surrender, was taken by the Arabs and brought to their capital, Medina.

=== The capture of Gundishapur ===
According to most sources, Gundishapur was the last major city in Khuzestan that the Arabs conquered. According to al-Tabari and al-Baladhuri, Abu Musa al-Ash'ari marched to Gundishapur and besieged the city in 642. The city didn't put up much of a resistance, due to its weak defence mechanism; after only a few days, the city surrendered and opened its gates. Abu Musa then made peace with the city in return for tribute, which the city accepted. However, some inhabitants of the city refused to live under the rule of the Rashidun Caliphate and fled to Kalbaniyah. Abu Musa then went to the city and easily seized it. He thereafter seized a few other small cities, thus completing the conquest of Khuzestan.

== Aftermath ==
After the conquest of Khuzestan, the inhabitants of the province didn't put much of a resistance as much as the other Sasanian provinces did. The biggest rebellion that took place in the province was the rebellion of Piruz in 643/4, who was defeated in the same year at Bayrudh. This was due to the mixed population of the province, where "people were used to different cultures and various religions" (Jalalipour).

== Sources ==
- Jalalipour, Saeid (2014). The Arab Conquest of Persia: The Khūzistān Province before and after the Muslims Triumph (PDF). Sasanika.
- Madelung, Wilferd (1998). The Succession to Muhammad: A Study of the Early Caliphate. London and New York: Cambridge University Press. ISBN 0-521-64696-0.
- Morony, Michael G. (2005) [1984]. Iraq After The Muslim Conquest. Gorgias Press LLC. ISBN 978-1-59333-315-7.
- Muir, Sir William (2004). The Caliphate: Its Rise, Decline, and Fall from Original Sources. London and New York: Kessinger Publishing. ISBN 1-4179-4889-2.
- Pourshariati, Parvaneh (2008). Decline and Fall of the Sasanian Empire: The Sasanian-Parthian Confederacy and the Arab Conquest of Iran. London and New York: I.B. Tauris. ISBN 978-1-84511-645-3.
- Rawlinson, George (2004). The Seven Great Monarchies of the Ancient Eastern World, Vol 7. (of 7): The Sassanian the History, Geography and Antiquities of Chaldaea, Assyria, Babylon, Media, Persia, Parthia and Sassanian or New Persian Empire. Library of Alexandria. ISBN 1-4655-0672-1.
- Shahbazi, A. Shapur. (2004). "HORMOZĀN". Encyclopaedia Iranica, Vol. I, Fasc. 5. pp. 460–461.
- Zakeri, Mohsen (1995). Sāsānid Soldiers in Early Muslim Society: The Origins of ʿAyyārān and Futuwwa. Wiesbaden: Otto Harrassowitz. ISBN 978-3-447-03652-8.
- Zarrinkub, Abd al-Husain (1975). "The Arab conquest of Iran and its aftermath". In Frye, Richard N. (ed.). The Cambridge History of Iran: From the Arab Invasion to the Saljuqs. Vol. 4. Cambridge: Cambridge University Press. pp. 1–57. ISBN 0-521-20093-8.
