= Aswaran =

Sasanian Empire cavalry force

- Country: Sasanian Empire
- Allegiance: Shahanshah, Eran-spahbed
- Branch: Sasanian army
- Type: Heavy cavalry
- Equipment: Lance, bow and arrows, sword, and less commonly dart, mace, and axe

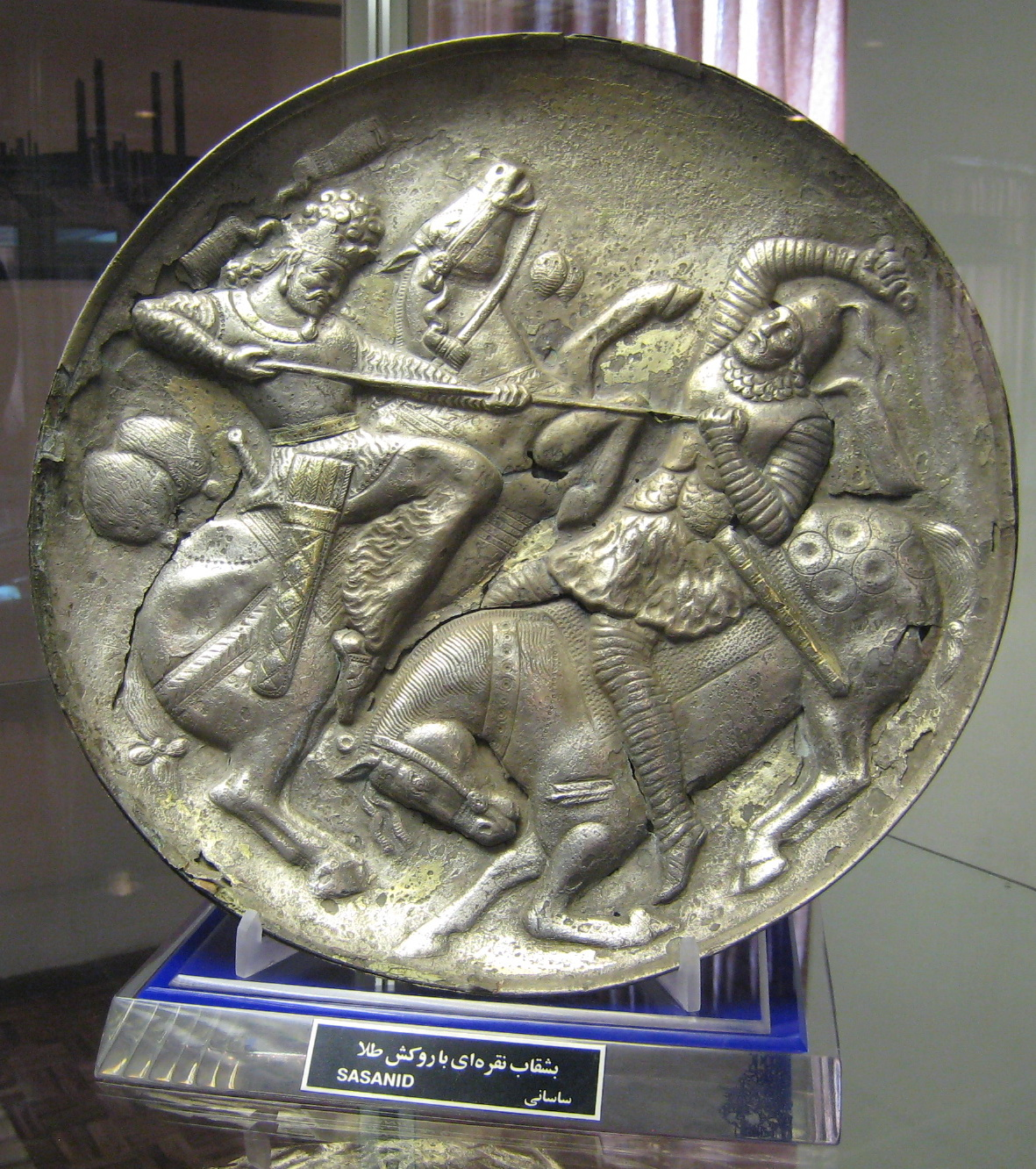
Sasanian silverware, showing a combat between two noble horsemen wearing scale armor, cuirass, chaps, and equipped with kontos, swords, quivers and arrows

The Aswārān (singular aswār), also spelled Asbārān and Savaran, was a cavalry force that formed the backbone of the army of the Sasanian Empire. They were provided by the aristocracy, were heavily armored, and ranged from archers to cataphracts.

== Etymology ==
The word comes from the Old Persian word asabāra (from asa- and bar, a frequently used Achaemenid military technical term). The various other renderings of the word are the following: Parthian asabāra (spelt spbr or SWSYN), Middle Persian aswār (spelt ʼswbʼl or SWSYA), Classical Persian suwār (سوار), uswār/iswār (اسوار), Modern Persian savār (سوار). The Arabic word asāwira (أساورة), used to refer to a certain faction of the Sasanian cavalry after the Muslim conquest, is a broken plural form of the Middle Persian aswār. However, the word aswār only means "horseman" in Middle Persian literature, and it is only the late Arabic term that has a more specialized meaning. In the Sassanian inscriptions, the formula asp ud mard (literally "horse and man") was commonly used to collectively refer to the cavalry and the infantry of the military.

== Organization ==
A system which disperses soldiers to estates outside the main fighting season does slow down mobilization and limit opportunities for unit drill, but it also provides on-the-spot capability to respond to local uprisings, brigandage or raids. Moreover, it uses resources more efficiently, since it is much cheaper to move a horseman to 3,000 kg of grain and hay than to do the reverse.

The aswaran were primarily composed of Iranian aristocrats from the wuzurgan and the azadan, with members of the staff being from the former. After the reforms of Khosraw I, warriors from the dehqan class would also be enlisted.

The asbaran have often been demonstrated as an example of existence of feudalism in Iran by modern scholars, who simply refer them as either chevalier, knight, or ritter. According to historians such as Christensen and Widengren, the asbar had the same status as the knight. However, although the asbaran and knight resemble each other in many parts, the economic role and historical role of the knight is very different compared to the role of the asbaran in the Sasanian Empire, which thus makes it incorrect to refer the asbaran as knights.

The highest annual salary for each cavalryman was 4,000 dirhams during Khosrow I's reign. The king, also a member of the unit, received an extra dirham.

== Weaponry, armor, and tactics ==
The aswaran wore chainmail armor, and ranged from archers to cataphracts. They mastered in single combat in battles (mard o-mard), and their valor was recognized with ornamental emblems. Titles such as hazārmard ("whose strength is equal to one thousand men"), zih asbār ("superior rider"), and pahlawān-i gēhān ("hero or champion of the world"), were their epithets. They wrote the name of the Sasanian emperor and their valuable family members on their arrows as a good omen. They outperformed others in archery to the extent that later writers thought that they had introduced the profession. They were superior and unmatched in the profession, which was even acknowledged by their enemies. The major effectiveness of the Sasanian cavalry was noted by contemporaneous Roman writers, including Ammianus Marcellinus, and led the Romans to adopt aspects of Sasanian cavalry including their arms, armour, and techniques.

=== Animals ===
The Aswaran rode on elephants and horses.

The favored horse breeds in Sasanian period were the famed Nisean horse along with a small traditional breed.

=== Armor ===
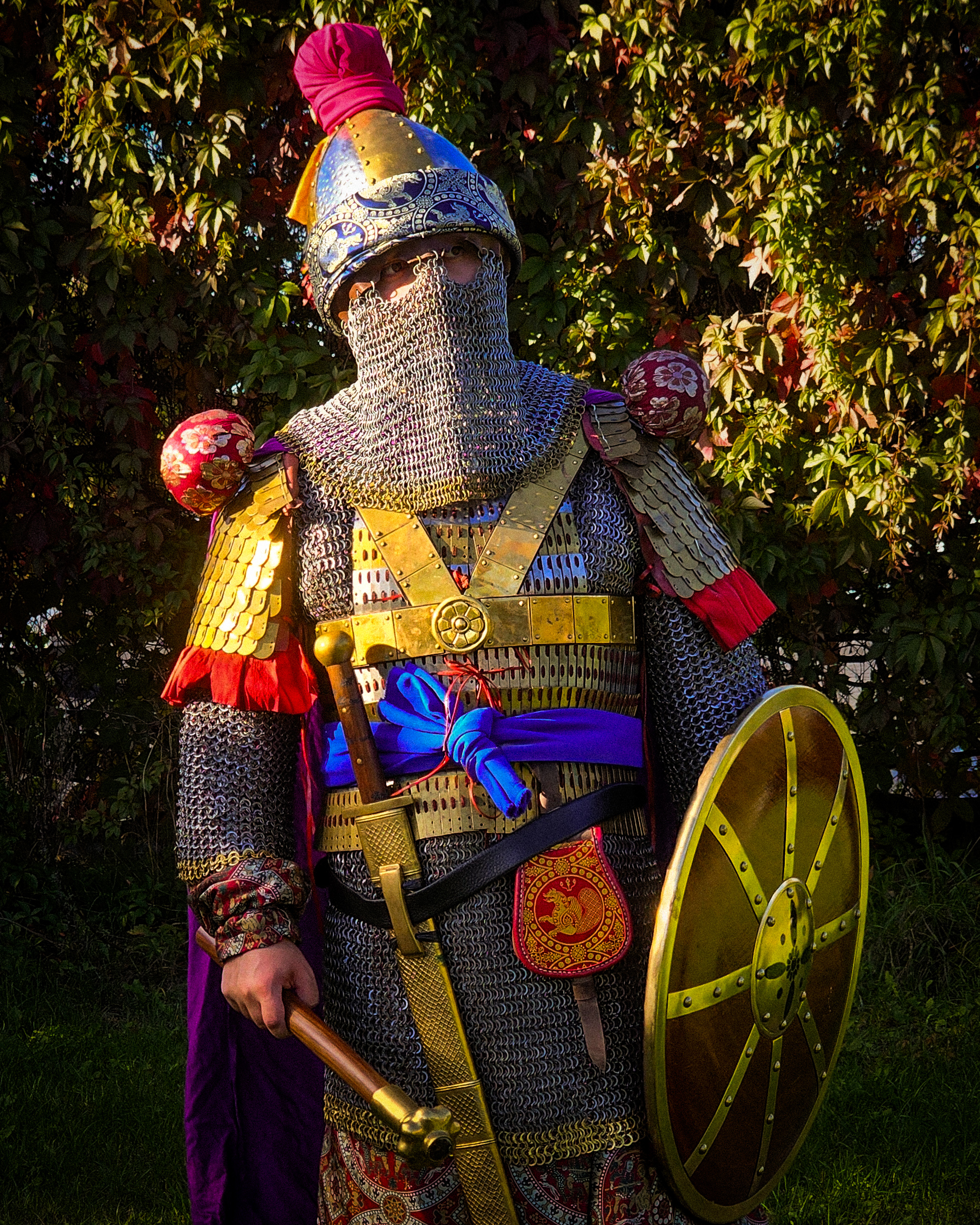
Modern reconstruction of a late Sassanian era "Spahbed" or Military Commander

The asbaran during this early period had much in common with their Parthian (Arsacid) predecessors, most of whom would have worn a scale armor cuirass with long sleeves and chaps covered in scale armor or, less often, plated mail. Their helmets, of the Spangenhelm type, would have been adapted throughout the Sasanian period. Also horses would probably have had armored chests and heads, consisting of an apron and headpiece, or total body protection consisting of five separate pieces, made from either boiled leather or scale armor. Some asbaran units such as mercenaries may have worn little to no armor at all, allowing them to be rather more swift, silent, and mobile.

=== Spangenhelm ===
The Spangenhelm helmets worn by members of the asbaran units in battle would have evolved through the centuries. During the 3rd to 6th century AD of the Sassanian empire, the Spangenhelm would have probably been made of felt and hardened leather. However, by the late 6th to early 7th century AD, they would have been decorated with flowers and purple ball with mail and small areas through which to breathe and see.

=== Weaponry ===
The asbaran cavalry was armed with a variety of weapons. The traditional heavy cavalry weapons, such as maces, lances, and swords would have been used, as well as a variety of other weapons, such as axes. Asbaran cavalry were not, however, restricted to short-range weapons, as they often carried weapons such as darts and bows.

The Sasanian cavalry's weaponry has been listed by Libanius as darts, sabres (scimitars?), spears, swords and "a lance which needed both hands". The nawak arrow-guide was used to launch 10–40 cm (3.9–15.7 in) long darts.

During Khosrow I's military reforms under Babak, the repertoire of the cavalry was standardized. According to the Arabic and Persian sources of the Islamic period, the pieces of equipment (Middle Persian: zēn) for a regular Sasanian cavalryman were as follows:

Equipment	in Middle Persian	in New Persian	Notes
Helmet	tlg (targ)	ترگ (targ), خود (xōd)	
Gorget	glywpʾn' (grīwbān)		
Breastplate / lamellar coat / cuirass		زره (zirih)	
Chain mail shirt / Hauberk		جوشن (jawšan)	
Gauntlets, iron-made	ʾp̄dst' (abdast)	ساعدین (sā'idayn)	
Girdle	kml (kamar)	کمر (kamar)	
Leg armor plates as thigh-guards	rān-band	ران‌بند (rān-band)	
Horse armor, either metal or leather	zynʾp̄cʾl (zēn-abzār), tiğfāf, bargustuwān, silī	زین‌افزار (zīn-afzār), برگستوان (bargustuwān)	
Lance (kontos)	nyck' (nēzag)	نیزه (nayza)	1 each.
Sword	šmšyl (šamšēr)	شمشیر (šamšēr)	1 each.
Shield	spl (spar)	سپر (sipar)	1 each.
Battle axe		تبرزین (tabarzīn)	
Mace	wlz (warz, wazr), gt' (gad)	گرز (gurz), عمود (amūd)	
Bow case		کمان‌دان (kamān-dān)	
Bows (with bowstrings)	kmʾn' (kamān)	کمان (kamān)	2 each.
Quiver	kntgl (kantigr)	تیردان (tīr-dān)	
Arrows	HTYA (tigr)	تیر (tīr)	30 each.
Bowstrings (spare)	zyh (zīh)	زه (zih)	2 each. They were looped and were hanging down the helmet.
Spear / javelin	sl (sel)		
Lasso		کمند (kamand)	Per some sources.
Sling with slingstones		فلاخن (falāxan)	Per some sources.

The Sasanian lance was based on the 12 ft (3.7 m) long Parthian kontos that featured a sword-like iron blade.

Face masks were used since at least the 4th century AD.

The horse-armor covered the torso (with an oval opening for the rider's seat), as well as the head and neck. Before stirrups came into widespread use, the riders relied on a saddle with "four horn" design for their stability. The Sasanian cavalry was relying more on maneuverability than their Parthian predecessors.

The late aswaran reportedly also employed a device or technique called panjagan to shoot a volley of five arrows.

=== Banner ===
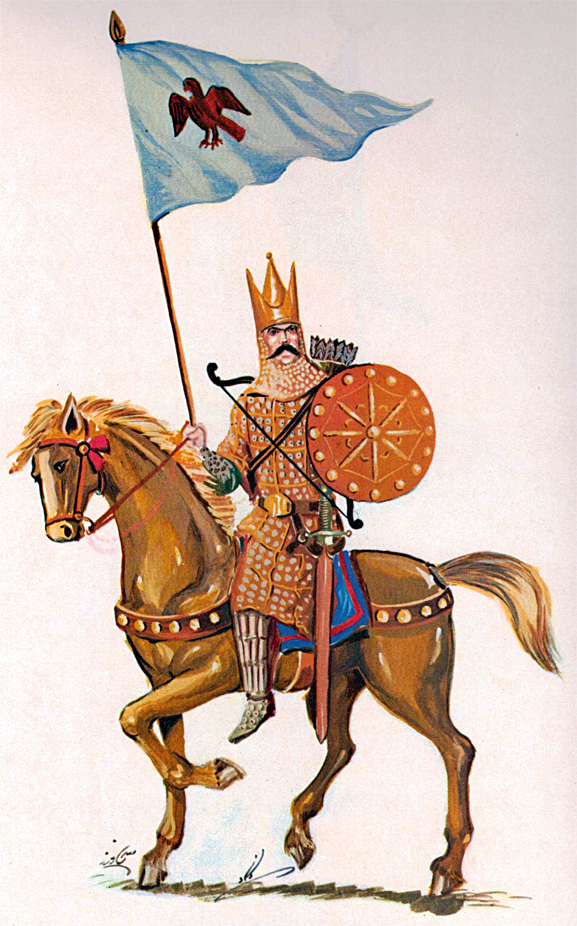
Illustration of an asbaran cavalryman holding a banner showing a Homa, a mythical bird of Iranian legends and fables

Each asbaran unit would have a Drafsh, or heraldric standard. These would have often included legendary creatures and animals. These animals would have included elephants, horses, bears, lions, and deer (ahu); these banners would also include Zoroastrian mythological creatures such as Bashkuch and the army of Asbaran would have the Derafsh Kaviani as their banner.

Some aswaran members with superior bravery, character, and equestrian skills were receiving honorary bracelets, recorded in Islamic sources as suwārī, with the wearer being called a musawwar.

== Elite Aswaran ==
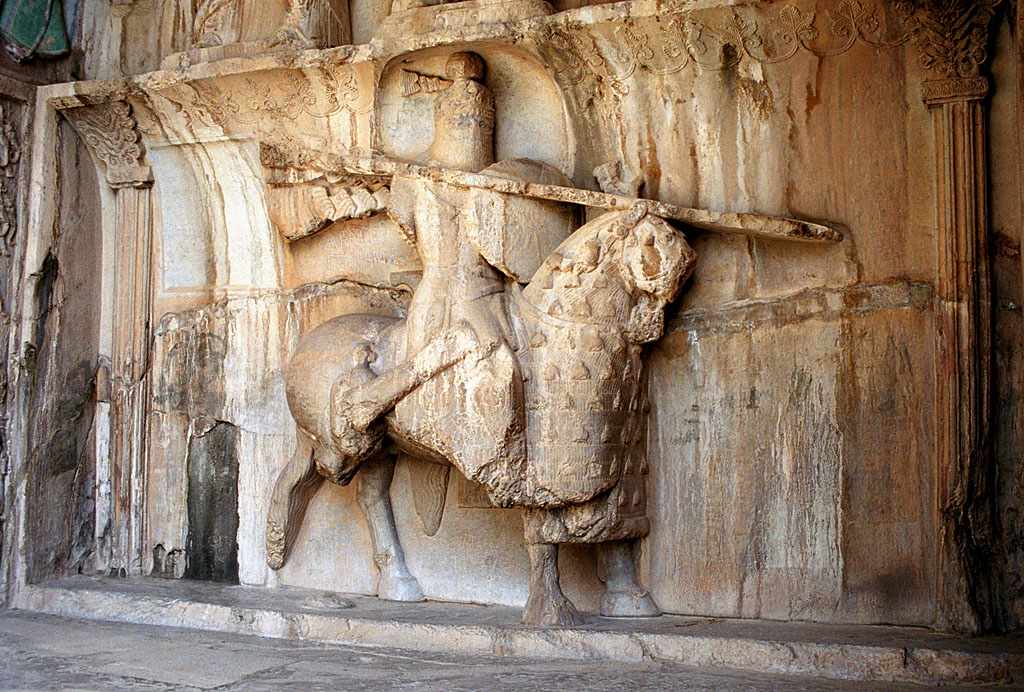
Equestrian statue of Khosrow II (r. 590–628) wearing the same armor used by the asbaran

The aswaran sardar were high-ranking officers who were in charge of the aswaran, their position was so high up in Sasanian society that they were only answerable to the Eran-Spahbad (Commander in Chief) and the Emperor himself. They would be guarded heavily by cataphract style cavalry. The post of aswaran sardar was held by a member of the House of Mihran. Parts of the aswaran division were high-ranking including the Pushtigban Body Guards, a super heavy shock cavalry, who were the royal guards of the Shah himself. The influential aswaran cavalry were mostly made up of heavily armoured cavalry, generally composed of aristocracy or even from the imperial family themselves. There were also commanders who were elite as well. These parts of the aswaran regiments were kept as reserves.

== After the fall of the Sasanians ==
Most of the asbaran was disbanded after suffering defeat and conquest during the Muslim conquest of Persia. However, several factions of the asbaran, each faction led by a different leader, defected to the Arabs in order to preserve their status and wealth. These asbaran factions settled in various places in the newly established Muslim territories, where they each become known by several names, the most known and prominent faction being the asawira, who under their leader Siyah settled in the newly established settlement of Basra.

After the Ghaznavid invasion of the Indian subcontinent, the term Aswar and later Sawar or Sowar is used to denote the rank of cavalry troops during the time of the Delhi Sultanate, Mughal Empire, British Raj and currently the cavalry troops of India and Pakistan.

== See also ==
- Cataphract
- Clibanarii
- Asawira
- Sasanian army
- Byzantine army
- Late Roman army
- Roman-Persian Wars
- Persian war elephants
- Aspbed
- Spahbed
- Furusiyya
- Zhayedan

== Sources ==
- Bosworth, C. E. (1987). "ASĀWERA". Encyclopaedia Iranica, Vol. II, Fasc. 7. pp. 706–707.
- Daryaee, Touraj (2009). Sasanian Persia: The Rise and Fall of an Empire. I.B.Tauris. pp. 1–240. ISBN 978-0857716668.
- Daryaee, Touraj (2018). "cavalry, Persian". In Nicholson, Oliver (ed.). The Oxford Dictionary of Late Antiquity. Oxford: Oxford University Press. ISBN 978-0-19-866277-8.
- Farrokh, Kaveh; Karamian, Gholamreza; Maksymiuk, Katarzyna (2018). A Synopsis of Sasanian Military Organization and Combat Units. Publishing House of Siedlce University of Natural Sciences and Humanities. ISBN 978-83-62447-22-0.
- Farrokh, Kaveh; Maksymiuk, Katarzyna; Garcia, Javier Sanchez (2018). The Siege of Amida (359 CE). Archeobooks. ISBN 978-83-7051-887-5.
- Jalalipour, Saeid (2014). The Arab Conquest of Persia: The Khūzistān Province before and after the Muslims Triumph (PDF). Sasanika. Archived from the original on 2018-10-03.
- McDonough, Scott (2013). "Military and Society in Sasanian Iran". In Campbell, Brian; Tritle, Lawrence A. (eds.). The Oxford Handbook of Warfare in the Classical World. Oxford University Press. pp. 600–620. doi:10.1093/oxfordhb/9780195304657.013.0031. ISBN 9780195304657.
- Morony, Michael G. (2005) [1984]. Iraq After The Muslim Conquest. Gorgias Press LLC. ISBN 978-1-59333-315-7.
- Nicolle, David (1996). Sassanian Armies: The Iranian Empire Early 3rd to mid-7th Centuries AD. Montvert Publishing. ISBN 1-874101-08-6.
- Penrose, Jane (2005). Rome and her Enemies: An Empire Created and Destroyed by War. Bloomsbury USA. ISBN 978-1-84176-932-5.
- Potts, Daniel; Rezakhani, Khodadad (2018). "armies and military administration, Persian". In Nicholson, Oliver (ed.). The Oxford Dictionary of Late Antiquity. Oxford: Oxford University Press. ISBN 978-0-19-866277-8.
- Pourshariati, Parvaneh (2008). Decline and Fall of the Sasanian Empire: The Sasanian-Parthian Confederacy and the Arab Conquest of Iran. London and New York: I.B. Tauris. ISBN 978-1-84511-645-3.
- Shapur Shahbazi, A. (1986). "Army i. Pre-Islamic Iran". Encyclopaedia Iranica, Vol. II, Fasc. 5. London et al. pp. 489–499.
- Zakeri, Mohsen (1995). Sāsānid Soldiers in Early Muslim Society: The Origins of ʿAyyārān and Futuwwa. Wiesbaden: Otto Harrassowitz. ISBN 978-3-447-03652-8.
- "History of Iran: Sassanian Army". www.iranchamber.com.
