= Siyah al-Uswari =

Iranian nobleman

Siyah, known in Arabic sources as Siyah al-Uswari ("Siyah the Aswar"; also spelled al-Aswari) was the commander of a faction of the Sasanian asbaran unit, but later defected to the Rashidun Caliphate, where he continued serving as the commander of the asbaran (which became known as the Asawira).

== Biography ==
During the Arab invasion of Iran, the Sasanian king Yazdegerd III (r. 632–651) sent 300 men under Siyah al-Uswari to defend Khuzestan. However, during the siege of Shushtar (641-642), Siyah and his men defected to the Arabs.

The reason for their defection was in order to preserve their status and wealth. However, according to the Khuzestan Chronicle, Siyah and his men first defected to the Arabs after they entered Shushtar. They thereafter settled in Basra, where they received salary. Furthermore, they also converted to Islam and allied themselves with the Banu Tamim of southern Iraq. However, the story about them converting to Islam is most likely inaccurate, since 15 years later, some members still appear with pure Zoroastrian Middle Persian names, such as a certain Mah Afridhan. Siyah is thereafter no longer mentioned; his son Yazid ibn Siyah al-Uswari continued the family's service in the Asawira.

== Sources ==
- Bosworth, C. E. (1987). "ASĀWERA". Encyclopaedia Iranica, Vol. II, Fasc. 7. pp. 706–707.
- Jalalipour, Saeid (2014). The Arab Conquest of Persia: The Khūzistān Province before and after the Muslims Triumph (PDF). Sasanika.
- Morony, Michael G. (2005) [1984]. Iraq After The Muslim Conquest. Gorgias Press LLC. ISBN 978-1-59333-315-7.
- Pourshariati, Parvaneh (2008). Decline and Fall of the Sasanian Empire: The Sasanian-Parthian Confederacy and the Arab Conquest of Iran. London and New York: I.B. Tauris. ISBN 978-1-84511-645-3.
- Zakeri, Mohsen (1995). Sāsānid Soldiers in Early Muslim Society: The Origins of ʿAyyārān and Futuwwa. Wiesbaden: Otto Harrassowitz. ISBN 978-3-447-03652-8.
