= Abu Musa al-Ash'ari =

Companion (Sahabi) of Muhammad

- Born: Abū Mūsā 'Abd Allah ibn Qays al-Ash'ari; 602; Zabid, South Arabia
- Died: c. 662 or 672 CE Mecca or Kufa
- Known for: Being a companion of the Islamic prophet Muhammad
- Conflicts: Muslim conquest of Khuzestan; Siege of Shushtar; Siege of Gundishapur; Battle of Bayrudh

Abu Musa Abd Allah ibn Qays al-Ash'ari (Arabic: أبو موسى عبد الله بن قيس الأشعري, romanized: Abū Mūsā ʿAbd Allāh ibn Qays al-Ashʿarī), better known as Abu Musa al-Ash'ari (Arabic: أبو موسى الأشعري, romanized: Abū Mūsā al-Ashʿarī) (died c. 662 or 672) was a companion of Muhammad and an important figure in early Islamic history. He was at various times governor of Basra and Kufa and was involved in the early Muslim conquest of Persia.

== Life ==
Abu Musa came originally from Zabid, in the region of Yemen, where his tribe, the Asha'ir, lived in the pre-Islamic period. He accepted Islam at Mecca prior to the hijra and returned to his native Yemen to propagate the faith. He lived in Habasha for some time until following the conquest of Khaybar in 628, when he came to Muhammad in Medina with more than fifty converts from Yemen, including his two brothers Abu Ruhm and Abu Burdah.

Following the conquest of Mecca in 629, Abu Musa was named among those sent by Muhammad on the expedition to Awtas. Two years later he was appointed as one of the governors over Yemen, where he remained until the caliphate of Abu Bakr, whom he joined in fighting the local leader of the ridda (lit. apostasy) movement.

== During Muhammad's era ==
He was present during the Expedition of Dhat al-Riqa. Some scholars claim that the expedition took place in Nejd (a large area of tableland in the Arabian Peninsula) in Rabi‘ Ath-Thani or Jumada Al-Ula, 4 A.H (or beginning of 5AH). They substantiate their claim by saying that it was strategically necessary to carry out this campaign in order to quell the rebellious bedouins in order to meet the exigencies of the agreed upon encounter with the polytheists, i.e. minor Badr Battle in Sha‘ban, 4 A.H. Muhammad received the news that certain tribes of Banu Ghatafan were assembling at Dhat al-Riqa with suspicious purposes.

Muhammad proceeded towards Nejd at the head of 400 or 700 men, after he had mandated Abu Dhar - in the Umayyad version, the Umayyad chief : Uthman ibn Affan was given this honor- to dispose of the affairs of Madinah during his absence. The Muslim fighters penetrated deep into their land until they reached a spot called Nakhlah where they came across some bedouins of Ghatfan.

The most authentic opinion according to "Saifur Rahman al Mubarakpuri", however, is that Dhat Ar-Riqa's campaign took place after the fall of Khaibar (and not as part of the Invasion of Nejd). This is supported by the fact that Abu Hurairah and Abu Musa Ashaari witnessed the battle. Abu Hurairah embraced Islam only some days before Khaibar, and Abu Musa Al-Ash‘ari came back from Abyssinia (Ethiopia) and joined Muhammad at Khaibar. The rules relating to the prayer of fear which Muhammad observed at Dhat Ar-Riqa's campaign, were revealed at the Asfan Invasion which scholars say, took place after Al-Khandaq (the Battle of the Trench).

== After the Caliphate of Abu Bakr ==
The appointments of Abu Musa to the governorates of Basra and Kufa were made during the caliphates of Umar and Uthman, but the exact dates and circumstances are not clear. However, during the period that he was governor of one or the other of the two Muslim garrison towns in Iraq, Abu Musa is frequently mentioned in connection with the early Muslim conquest of the Sasanian Empire. In the Siege of Shushtar (642) he distinguished himself as a military commander. The Persian commander, Hormuzan, had withdrawn his forces to the fortified city of Shushtar. The Caliph Umar did not underestimate the strength of the enemy and he mobilized a force to confront Hormuzan. Among the Muslim forces were dedicated veterans like Ammar ibn Yasir, Al-Baraa ibn Malik al-Ansari, and his brother Anas, Majra'a al-Bakri, and Salamah ibn Rajaa. Umar appointed Abu Musa as commander of the army. Tostar was impossible to take by storm and several unsuccessful attempts were made to breach the walls. However, a Persian defector opened the city's gates from within making way for Abu Musa's army.

When Basra was established during 'Umar's period, he started building some canals for conveying drinking water and for irrigation. Al-Tabari reports that 'Utba ibn Ghazwan built the first canal from the Tigris River to the site of Basra when the city was in the planning stage. After the city was built, 'Umar appointed Abu Musa al-Ash'ari as the first governor. Al-Ash'ari governed during the period 17-29/638-650. He began building two important canals linking Basra with the Tigris River. These were the al-Ubulla River and the Ma'qil River. The two canals were the basis for the agricultural development of the whole Basra region and were used for drinking water. 'Umar also devised the policy of cultivating barren lands by assigning such lands to those who undertook to cultivate them. This policy continued during the Umayyad period and it resulted in the cultivation of large areas of barren lands through the construction of irrigation canals by the state and by individuals.

During the time of Caliph Uthman, Abu Musa al-Ash'ari was replaced by Abdullah ibn Aamir as governor of Basra. Abu Musa al-Ash'ari didn't show resentment about his replacement, instead he praised Abdullah Ibn Aamir as his worthy and adequate successor.

== Following the assassination of Uthman ==
There are many unresolved issues regarding the First Fitna (literally "trial") period of dissension and civil war, which split the Muslim community following the assassination of the Caliph Uthman. When Ali arrived in Kufa in 656 seeking support against Aisha bint Abi Bakr and the Basrans it is agreed that Abu Musa (then the governor of Kufa), urged his subjects not to support Ali and avoid participation in the upcoming battle. When his advice was rejected and the people of Kufa supported Ali, Abu Musa was forced to leave and Ali disposed him from his Governorate.

However, the next year Abu Musa was named as the arbitrator (hakam) chosen by defactors in Ali's party by the terms agreed between Ali and Muawiyah after the battle of Siffin. There are many historical versions of the result of the arbitration court. According to academic research done by Khalid Kabir Alal at the University of Algeria, the most authentic version is that both Abu Musa and 'Amr ibn al-'As, the arbitrator appointed by Muawiyah I, decided that Muawiyah will be deposed, and the fate of the murderers of Uthman will be decided by the remaining of The Ten Promised Paradise.

After this Abu Musa died in Mecca and some say in Kufa. There are several different dates given for his death, the most common being 662 and 672.

== Contributions to Islamic learning ==
Despite Abu Musa's reputation as a soldier and politician, he was also praised for his beautiful recitation of the Qur'an, and he is associated with one of the early versions (mashahef), which was superseded by Uthman's recension. Some of the variants of Abu Musa's version have been preserved. He was also a respected faqih and was regarded among the leading judges in early Muslim history. People used to say: "The judges in this ummah are four: Umar, Ali ibn Abi Talib, Abu Musa, and Zayd ibn Thabit." Abu Musa is also credited with narrating numerous hadith, as well as being the ancestor of the founder of the Ash'ari theological school within Islam, Abu al-Hasan al-Ash'ari (d.935).

== See also ==
- Al-Asha'ir Mosque
- Sunni view of the Sahaba
- Dhikr
- Al Haleem
- List of battles of Muhammad
