= Hormuzan =

Sasanian general

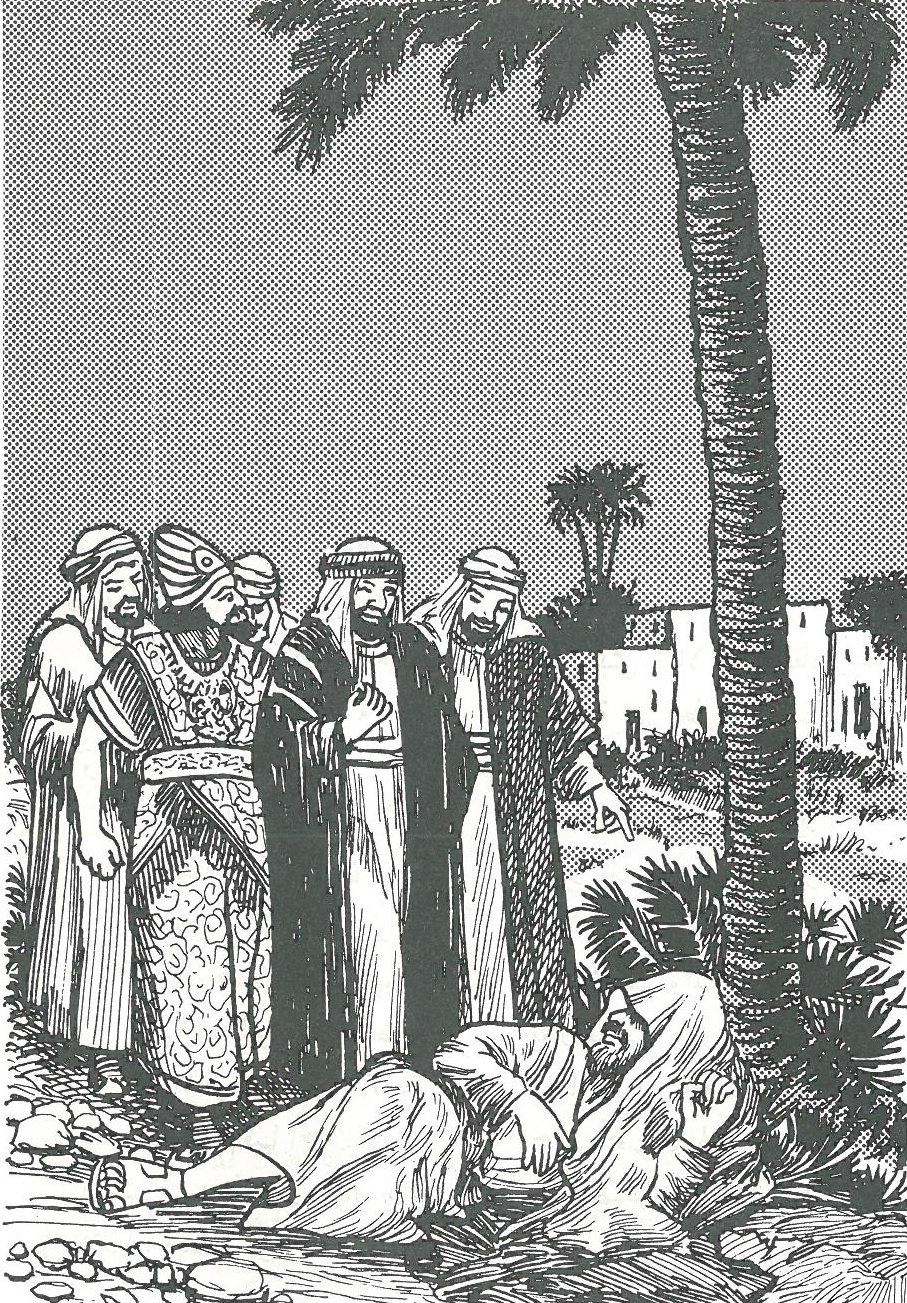
- Hormuzan being brought before Caliph Umar, who is found sleeping soundly in the shadow of a palm tree.
- Born: Mihragan-kadag, Media, Sasanian Empire
- Died: 644; Medina, Rashidun Caliphate
- Military career
- Allegiance: Sasanian Empire
- Service: Sasanian army
- Rank: Shahrdar (governor)

Hormuzan (Middle Persian: Hormazdān, New Persian: هرمزان) was a Persian aristocrat who served as the governor of Khuzestan, and was one of the Sasanian military officers at the Battle of al-Qādisiyyah. He was later taken prisoner by the Muslims after the fall of Shushtar in 642. Two years later, he was accused of the assassination of the Rashidun caliph Umar, and was killed by Ubayd Allah, the deceased caliph's son.

== Family and early life ==
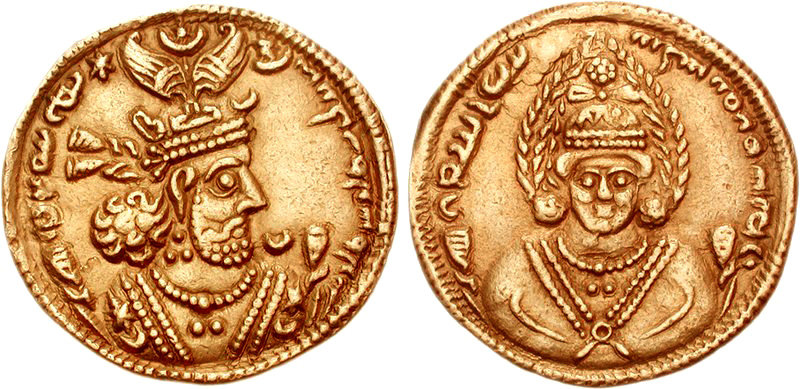
Gold dinar of Khosrow II.

Hormuzan was a wealthy aristocrat native to Mihragan-kadag, a district in Media, and belonged to one of the seven Parthian clans of the Sasanian Empire. He had a brother named Shahriyar, who was the governor of Susa. According to some sources, Hormuzan was the brother-in-law of Khosrow II (r. 590–628) and the maternal uncle of Kavad II (r. 628), but this is most likely incorrect, since Kavadh's mother was not an Iranian, but a Byzantine princess named Maria. According to Pourshariati, Hormuzan may have belonged to a Persian family instead of a Parthian one. Although his origin is disputed, it is known that he was part of the Parsig (Persian) faction which is first mentioned in 628 and played a major role in Sasanian politics. Hormuzan ruled his birthplace Mihragan-kadag as a part of his family domain, and all of Khuzistan, one of the richest provinces of the Sasanian Empire.

Hormuzan is first mentioned in 609 as one of the Sasanian officers who participated in the Battle of Dhi Qar. The rebelling Arabs managed to defeat the Sasanians at the battle, but order was soon restored by Ruzbi, the frontier governor (marzban) of al-Hira. In 628, Khosrow II was overthrown by his son Kavadh II, who crowned himself as the new shahanshah (king of kings) of the Sasanian Empire. Three days later, Kavadh ordered Mihr Hormozd to execute his father. In 632, after a period of coups and revolts, Yazdegerd III (r. 632–651) was crowned as king of the Sasanian Empire at Estakhr, an ancient Iranian city in Pars, where the Sasanian family had founded their empire.

== The Arab invasion of western Iran ==
Map of Sasanian Khuzestan.

In 633, the Muslim Arabs invaded Persia, and by 636, they were camping at al-Qadisiyyah, a city close to Ctesiphon, the capital of the Sasanian Empire. The Sasanian army chief (spahbed), Rostam Farrokhzad, prepared to make a counter-attack, raising an army which included the Parsig faction under Piruz Khosrow, Bahman Jadhuyih and Hormuzan; the Pahlav (Parthian) faction under Rostam himself and Mihran Razi; and an Armenian contingent under Jalinus and Musel III Mamikonian. The army also included the military officer Kanadbak and his son, known in Arabic sources as Shahriyar bin Kanara. During the battle, the Sasanian army was defeated, and Shahriyar, along with Musel, Bahman, Jalinus and Rostam, were killed. The Arabs then besieged Ctesiphon.

Hormuzan managed to survive, and along with Nakhiragan, Mihran Razi and Piruz Khosrow, including the rest of the survivors, regrouped at Bavel (Babylon), where they tried to repel the Arab army, but were once again defeated. Hormuzan then fled to Hormizd-Ardashir in Khuzestan, which he used as his base in his raids in Meshan against the Arabs. Yazdegerd III supported him in these raids, and believed that it was possible to regain the territories which had been taken by the Arabs. Hormuzan, along with the rest of the survivors of al-Qadisiyyah, later regrouped again and fought the Arabs at the battle of Jalula in 637. The Sasanian army was once again defeated and Mihran Razi was killed. Hormuzan then withdrew once again to Hormizd-Ardashir, where he chose to stay in case the Arabs should invade his domains.

Hormuzan continued his raids into Meshan and also began raiding Iraq. He repelled the Kurds who had been making incursions into Pars and Khuzestan. Hormuzan shortly clashed with an Arab army to the west of Hormizd-Ardashir, but was easily defeated and thus retreated to the city, where he sued for peace. The Arabs asked for tribute in exchange for peace, which he agreed to. However, he soon stopped paying tribute, and raised an army which included the Kurds he previously had fought. The caliph (ruler) of the Rashidun Arabs responded by sending an army under a certain Hurqus ibn Zuhayr as-Sa'di, who defeated Hormuzan in 638 at Hormizd-Ardashir, and forced the city to pay jizya (poll-tax). Hormuzan fled to Ram-Hormizd, and once again sought a peace treaty, which he was granted in return for tribute.

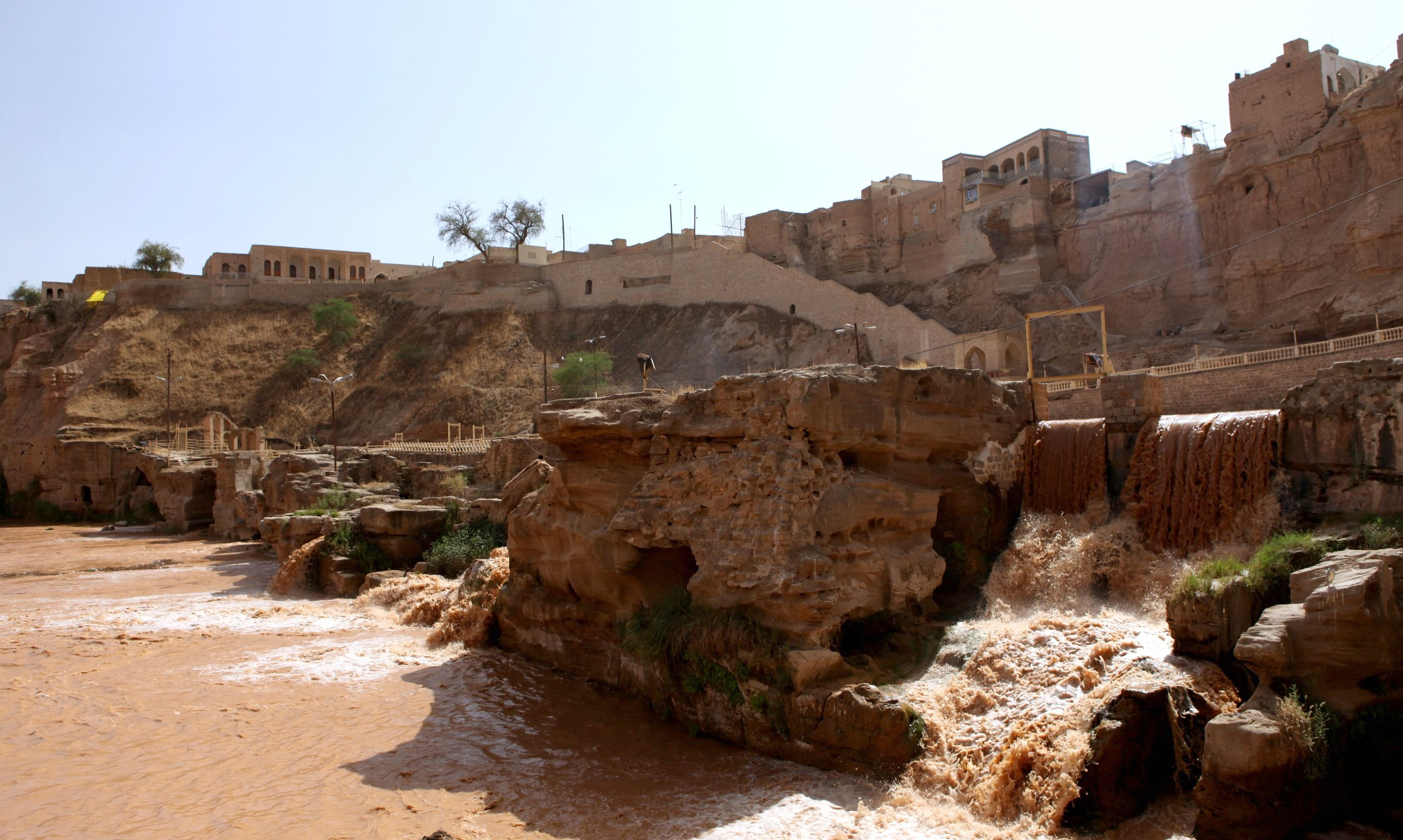
Remains of Sasanian architecture in Shushtar.

However, he later stopped paying tribute, and as a result clashed with the Arabs again, who inflicted a defeat on him. The cities of Khuzestan were slowly one by one seized. Sometime later in 641, after a defeat at Ram-Hormizd, Hormuzan fled to Shushtar, and was defeated near the city, which cost him the lives of 900 of his men, while 600 were captured and would later be executed. Nevertheless, he managed to reach the city. The Arabs then laid siege to the city.

Fortunately for Hormuzan, Shushtar was well fortified due to the rivers and canals that surrounded it on almost all sides. There are several versions of how the city was captured; according to al-Tabari, during the siege, an Iranian defector named Sina (or Sinah) went to al-Nu'man and pleaded for his life to be spared in return for showing him a way into the city. Al-Nu'man agreed, and Sina told him to "attack via the outlet of the water, and then you will conquer the city."

Al-Nu'man did as he told him, and with a small portion of his army, charged into Shushtar. Hormuzan then retreated to the citadel and continued his resistance. The surviving men of Hormuzan who were in citadel along with him, killed their own family members and threw their property into the river rather than let the Arabs take them. In the end, Hormuzan was eventually forced to surrender.

According to another version written in the Khuzestan Chronicle, similar to the version by al-Tabari, a defector from Qatar, along with another person, asked the Arabs for some of their plunder in exchange for how to enter the city. The Arabs agreed, and after some time, they managed to enter the city. According to al-Baladhuri, during the siege, the Arabs were reinforced with a group of professional Iranian elites under Siyah al-Uswari, known as the Asawira. The reason for their defection was in order to preserve their status and wealth. However, according to the Khuzestan Chronicle, the Asawira first defected to the Arabs after they entered Shushtar. The brother of Hormuzan, Shahriyar, is said to have been a part of the Asawira. According to Pourshariati, the story of the Asawira helping the Arabs in their conquest of Khuzestan, may have been false. Nevertheless, it is known that Hormuzan was after his surrender taken by the Arabs and brought to their capital Medina.

== Captivity and death ==
What happened after is told by George Rawlinson, in summary, as follows:

Hormuzan, on obtaining an audience, pretended thirst and asked for a cup of water, which was given him; he then looked suspiciously around, as if he expected to be stabbed while drinking. "Fear nothing," said Umar; "your life is safe till you have drunk the water." The crafty Persian flung the cup to the ground, and Umar felt that he had been outwitted, but that he must keep his word.

In contrast, the Arab tradition holds that Hormuzan, when first brought as a prisoner before the Rashidun Caliph Umar, was asked to convert. He refused, and so Umar called his executioner to kill him. At that point Hormuzan asked for some water, claiming that it would be cruel to kill him while thirsty. Umar had water brought, and upon Hormuzan obtaining a pledge of safety until he'd finished drinking he threw the cup to the ground. He then asked the Caliph if he would keep his word, and Umar agreed and spared his life. Immediately afterwards, Hormuzan converted to Islam, explaining that he had not wanted it said that he'd converted for fear of death.

While in Medina, he advised the Rashidun Caliph Umar in making important fiscal and institutional changes. However, in 644, Hormuzan was killed by Umar's son Ubayd Allah, after an involvement in a plot which killed Umar. Umar's successor, Caliph Uthman, instead of punishing Ubayd Allah for his actions, had him pardoned. This was not well received by some of Hormuzan's Arab supporters who strongly protested to Uthman and even later tried to take action against Ubayd Allah, who managed to flee to the governor of Syria, Mu'awiya I.

== Sources ==
- Shahbazi, A. Shapur. (2004). "HORMOZĀN". In Yarshater, Ehsan (ed.). Encyclopædia Iranica. Vol. XII/5: Homosexuality III–Human migration II. London and New York: Routledge & Kegan Paul. pp. 460–461. ISBN 978-0-933273-79-5.
- Pourshariati, Parvaneh (2008). Decline and Fall of the Sasanian Empire: The Sasanian-Parthian Confederacy and the Arab Conquest of Iran. London and New York: I.B. Tauris. ISBN 978-1-84511-645-3.
- Zarrinkub, Abd al-Husain (1975). "The Arab conquest of Iran and its aftermath". In Frye, Richard N. (ed.). The Cambridge History of Iran: From the Arab Invasion to the Saljuqs. Vol. 4. Cambridge: Cambridge University Press. pp. 1–57. ISBN 0-521-20093-8.
- Morony, Michael G. (2005) [1984]. Iraq After The Muslim Conquest. Gorgias Press LLC. ISBN 978-1-59333-315-7.
- Jalalipour, Saeid (2014). The Arab Conquest of Persia: The Khūzistān Province before and after the Muslims Triumph (PDF). Sasanika.
- Rawlinson, George (2004). The Seven Great Monarchies of the Ancient Eastern World, Vol 7. (of 7): The Sassanian the History, Geography and Antiquities of Chaldaea, Assyria, Babylon, Media, Persia, Parthia and Sassanian or New Persian Empire. Library of Alexandria. ISBN 1-4655-0672-1.
- Madelung, Wilferd (1998). The Succession to Muhammad: A Study of the Early Caliphate. London and New York: Cambridge University Press. ISBN 0-521-64696-0.
- Muir, Sir William (2004). The Caliphate: Its Rise, Decline, and Fall from Original Sources. London and New York: Kessinger Publishing. ISBN 1-4179-4889-2.
- Zakeri, Mohsen (1995). Sāsānid Soldiers in Early Muslim Society: The Origins of ʿAyyārān and Futuwwa. Wiesbaden: Otto Harrassowitz. ISBN 978-3-447-03652-8.
- Abū al-Faḍl Ibrāhīm, Muḥammad; Aḥmad Jād al-Mawlā, Muḥammad; Muḥammad al-Bajāwī, ʻAlī (2003). Qiṣaṣ al-ʻArab (1st ed.). Bayrūt: al-Maktabah al-ʻAsriyah. ISBN 9953-34-054-4.
