= Asawira =

The Asawira (Arabic: أساورة) were a military unit of the Rashidun and Umayyad Caliphate. The unit consisted of Iranian noblemen who were originally part of the aswaran unit of the Sasanian army. It was disbanded in 703 by al-Hajjaj ibn Yusuf.

== Etymology ==
The word is the Arabic broken plural form of the Middle Persian word aswār ("horseman"), which in turn is from the Old Persian word asabāra. The Parthian form is asbār.

== Background ==
During the Arab invasion of Iran, the Sasanian king Yazdegerd III (r. 632–651) sent 1,000 cavalrymen under Siyah al-Uswari to defend Khuzestan. These 1,000 men were of ethnic Iranians from Isfahan and region between Isfahan and Khuzestan, and served in the aswaran unit. During the siege of Shushtar (641–642), they defected to the Arabs, and settled in Basra, where they received salary. Furthermore, they also converted to Islam and allied themselves with the Banu Tamim of southern Iraq. However, the story about them converting to Islam is most likely inaccurate, since 15 years later, some members still appear with Zoroastrian names, such as a certain Mah-Afridhan.

== History ==
They thereafter participated in the conquest of Pars, Kerman, and Khorasan. After the fall of the Rashidun Caliphate in 661, they continued serving under their successors, the Umayyad Caliphate. One year later, the Umayyad caliph Muawiyah I (661–680) resettled some of the Asawira in Antioch. According to Ibn al-Faqih, the Umayyad governor Ziyad ibn Abi Sufyan had a mosque constructed in Basra for them in the late 660s.

During the Second Fitna, the Asawira under Mah-Afridhun helped the Tamim tribe in the rebellion that killed the governor of Basra, Mas'ud ibn Amr (d. 684). The Asawira later joined the rebellion of Abd al-Rahman ibn Muhammad ibn al-Ash'ath, which lasted from 700 to 703. However, this made the Arab statesman al-Hajjaj ibn Yusuf disband the Asawira, by destroying their homes, reducing their salary, and resettling them to other cities. Some of their descendants are later mentioned in some sources, such as Musa ibn Sayyar al-Uswari, who was the student of Hasan of Basra, a prominent Muslim scholar, who was also of Iranian origin.

== See also ==
- Aswaran, the Sasanian cavalry unit which preceded the Rashidun Asawira

== Sources ==
- Pourshariati, Parvaneh (2008). Decline and Fall of the Sasanian Empire: The Sasanian-Parthian Confederacy and the Arab Conquest of Iran. London and New York: I.B. Tauris. ISBN 978-1-84511-645-3.
- Jalalipour, Saeid (2014). The Arab Conquest of Persia: The Khūzistān Province before and after the Muslims Triumph (PDF). Sasanika.
- Bosworth, C. E. (1987). "ASĀWERA". Encyclopaedia Iranica, Vol. II, Fasc. 7. pp. 706–707.
- Morony, Michael G. (2005) [1984]. Iraq After The Muslim Conquest. Gorgias Press LLC. ISBN 978-1-59333-315-7.
- Zakeri, Mohsen (1995). Sasanid Soldiers in Early Muslim Society: The Origins of 'Ayyārān and Futuwwa. Otto Harrassowitz Verlag. pp. 1–391. ISBN 3447036524.
