= Khuzistan (Sasanian province) =

Province of the Sasanian Empire

Khuzistan Hūzistān
- Province of the Sasanian Empire
- 224–642
- Map of Khuzistan
- Capital: Gundeshapur
- Historical era: Late Antiquity
  - Established: 224
  - Muslim conquest: 642
Preceded by	Succeeded by
Parthian Empire; Elymais	Rashidun Caliphate
- Today part of: Iran

Khuzistan or Huzistan (Middle Persian: 𐭧𐭥𐭰𐭮𐭲𐭭 Hūzistān) was a Sasanian province in Late Antiquity, which almost corresponded to the present-day province of Khuzestan. Its capital was Gundeshapur. During the late Sasanian era, the province was included in the southern quadrant (kust) of Nemroz.

== Name ==
The name of Khuzistan (meaning "the land of the Khuz") goes back to the Elamite period, where it was used to refer to the inhabitants that lived in the region from the 3rd millennium BC until the rise of the Achaemenid Empire in 539 BC.

== Districts ==
The administrative division of Khuzestan is uncertain, due to Arabic sources reporting varying reports. Khuzestan was divided at least into seven districts (rostag or tasug), the largest being Hormizd-Ardashir, whilst the others were; Rostam Kawad, Shushtar, Susa, Gundishapur, Ram-Hormizd and Dauraq.

== History ==
A Parthian-language fragment from the Manichaean Turpan documents about the death of Mani in the city of Bēlābād (Gundeshapur), in Sasanian Khuzistan (Parthian: Hūzhistān).

Under the Parthians, Khuzistan was known as Elymais, a Parthian sub-kingdom, which in c. 221 was defeated and conquered by the Persian prince Ardashir I, who would later overthrow the Parthians and establish the Sasanian Empire. Khuzistan is attested as a province in the Ka'ba-ye Zartosht inscription of the second Sasanian King of Kings (shahanshah) Shapur I (r. 240–270). There it is mentioned right after Pars and Parthia, the country of the Sasanians and Parthians respectively, which demonstrates its importance. The prominent Zoroastrian priest Kartir likewise mentions the province in his inscription at Naqsh-e Rajab. In c. 260, Shapur I founded the city of Gundeshapur (Middle Persian: Weh-Andiōk-Šābuhr), which was established in a village called Pilabad, situated between Susa and Shushtar. The city, constructed as a place to settle Roman prisoners of war, subsequently became a Sasanian royal summer residence and the capital of Khuzistan. Shapur I's son and successor, Hormizd I (r. 270–271) founded two cities in Khuzistan; Hormizd-Ardashir and Ram-Hormizd. During the reign of Bahram II (r. 274–293), a high-priest (mowbed) revolted in Khuzistan and briefly occupied the province.

Under Kavad I (r. 488–496, 498–531) and his son and successor Khosrow I (r. 531–579) the empire was divided into four frontier regions (kust in Middle Persian), with a military commander (spahbed) in charge of each district. The frontier regions were known as xwarāsān (East), xwarārān (West), nēmrōz (South) and abāxtar (North). Khuzistan was along with Pars included in the southern quarter. Kirman and Sakastan were also sometimes included. Khuzistan was one of the first provinces to fall during the Muslim conquest of Iran; by 642 it was longer under Sasanian control.

== Population ==
The population was mainly centered around its river and canal systems. The north and east was populated by an amalgamation of Iranians and Elamites, while the western portion was populated by Aramaic-speaking people. Roman and Indian deportees also lived in the province.

== Mint ==
Khuzistan served as one of the mint-striking sites of the Sasanians, known by its mint abbreviation of "HŪZ". The city of Ram-Hormizd produced mints since at least the third century. A mint was established in Hormizd-Ardashir during the reign Ardashir II (r. 379–383), and a mint was established in Gundeshapur and Susa during the reign of Bahram IV (r. 388–399).

== Sources ==
- Axworthy, Michael (2008). A History of Iran: Empire of the Mind. New York: Basic Books. pp. 1–368. ISBN 978-0-465-00888-9.
- Badiyi, Bahram (2020). "Cities and Mint Centers Founded by the Sasanians". Ancient Iranian Numismatics: 203–233. doi:10.1163/9789004460720_012. ISBN 9789004460720. S2CID 242624054.
- Brunner, Christopher (1983). "Geographical and Administrative divisions: Settlements and Economy". In Yarshater, Ehsan (ed.). The Cambridge History of Iran: The Seleucid, Parthian and Sasanian Periods. Vol. 3(2). Cambridge: Cambridge University Press. pp. 747–778. ISBN 0-521-24693-8.
- Daryaee, Touraj (2014). Sasanian Persia: The Rise and Fall of an Empire. I.B.Tauris. pp. 1–240. ISBN 978-0857716668.
- Frye, R. N. (1983). "The political history of Iran under the Sasanians". In Yarshater, Ehsan (ed.). The Cambridge History of Iran: The Seleucid, Parthian and Sasanian Periods. Vol. 3(1). Cambridge: Cambridge University Press. ISBN 0-521-20092-X.
- Frye, Richard Nelson (1984). The History of Ancient Iran. C.H.Beck. pp. 1–411. ISBN 9783406093975. "false."
- Ghodrat-Dizaji, Mehrdad (2010). "Ādurbādagān during the Late Sasanian Period: A Study in Administrative Geography". Iran: Journal of the British Institute of Persian Studies. 48 (1): 69–80. doi:10.1080/05786967.2010.11864774. S2CID 163839498.
- Hansman, John F. (1998). "Elymais". Encyclopaedia Iranica, Vol. VIII, Fasc. 4. pp. 373–376.
- Jalalipour, Saeid (2015). "The Arab Conquest of Persia: The Khūzistān Province before and after the Muslims Triumph" (PDF). Sasanika.
- Miri, Negin (2012). "Sasanian Pars: Historical Geography and Administrative Organization". Sasanika: 1–183.
- Miri, Negin (2013). "Sasanian Administration and Sealing Practices". In Potts, Daniel T. (ed.). The Oxford Handbook of Ancient Iran. Oxford University Press. ISBN 978-0199733309.
- Payne, Richard E. (2015). A State of Mixture: Christians, Zoroastrians, and Iranian Political Culture in Late Antiquity. Univ of California Press. pp. 1–320. ISBN 9780520961531.
- Potts, D. T. (1999). The Archaeology of Elam: Formation and Transformation of an Ancient Iranian State. Cambridge University Press. pp. 1–490. ISBN 9780521564960.
- Rezakhani, Khodadad (2017). "East Iran in Late Antiquity". ReOrienting the Sasanians: East Iran in Late Antiquity. Edinburgh University Press. pp. 1–256. ISBN 9781474400305. JSTOR 10.3366/j.ctt1g04zr8. (registration required)
- Shahbazi, A. Shapur; Richter-Bernburg, Lutz (2002). "Gondēšāpur". Encyclopædia Iranica, online edition, Vol. XI, Fasc. 2. pp. 131–135.
- Shayegan, M. Rahim (2004). "Hormozd I". Encyclopaedia Iranica, Vol. XII, Fasc. 5. pp. 462–464.
- Wiesehöfer, Joseph (1986). "Ardašīr I i. History". Encyclopaedia Iranica, Vol. II, Fasc. 4. pp. 371–376.
