= Michael G. Morony =

American historian (born 1939)

- Born: September 30, 1939 (age 87); Sacramento California, U.S.

Academic background
- Education: University of California, Los Angeles; University of California, Berkeley

Academic work
- Discipline: Ancient and Islamic Near East

Michael Gregory Morony (born September 30, 1939) has been a professor of history at UCLA since 1974, with interests in the history of Ancient and Islamic Near East.

Morony was born in 1939 in Sacramento and was raised in Alaska. He holds a BA in Near Eastern Languages from the University of California, Berkeley, and an MA in Islamic Studies and a PhD (1972) in History from the University of California, Los Angeles. His dissertation, originally advised by Gustave von Grunebaum, was concerned with the history of Mesopotamia after the Islamic Conquests. The edited dissertation was later published as Iraq After the Muslim Conquest. Upon von Grunebaum's death, his dissertation was supervised by Nikki Keddie. In addition to these scholars, Morony has also worked with W. B. Henning in Berkeley and M. A. Shaban.

Morony's research is mostly concerned with the economic history of the Near East, North Africa and Muslim Iberia. He has written many articles on the subject and is considered one of the authorities on the socio-economic history of Iraq and Syria in the early medieval period.

Among the scholars who Morony served on the Ph.D. advisory committees of was Daniel C. Peterson, Vincent Cornell, Qamar-ul Huda, Mahmoud Ibrahim, and Touraj Daryaee.

== Works ==
- Morony, Michael G. (1974). "Religious Communities in Late Sasanian and Early Muslim Iraq". Journal of the Economic and Social History of the Orient. 17 (2): 113–135. doi:10.2307/3596328. JSTOR 3596328.
- Morony, Michael G. (1984). Iraq After the Muslim Conquest. Princeton, NJ: Princeton University Press. ISBN 978-0-691-05395-0. Reprint (Piscataway, Gorgias Press, 2009).
- The History of al-Tabari, Vol. XVIII, "Between Civil Wars: The Caliphate of Mu'awiyah" (Albany, SUNY Press, 1987), translation
- Morony, Michael G. (1991). "The Aramaean Population in the Economic Life of Early Islamic Iraq". ARAM Periodical. 3 (1): 1–6.
- Villagomez, Cynthia J.; Morony, Michael G. (1999). "Ecclesiastical Wealth in the East Syrian Church from Late Antiquity to Early Islam". In Reinink, G.J.; Klugkist, A.C. (eds.). After Bardaisan: Studies on Continuity and Change in Syriac Christianity. Leuven: Peeters Publishers. pp. 303–315. ISBN 978-90-429-0735-5.
- Morony, Michael G. (2000). "Michael the Syrian as a Source for Economic History" (PDF). Hugoye: Journal of Syriac Studies. 3 (2): 141–172. doi:10.31826/hug-2010-030111.
- "Production and the Exploitation of Resources", Series : The Formation of the Classical Islamic World: 11, (Andershot, Ashgate/Variorum, 2002), ISBN 978-0-86078-706-8 (ed.)
- "Manufacturing and Labour", Series : The Formation of the Classical Islamic World: 12, (Andershot, Ashgate/Variorum, 2003), ISBN 978-0-86078-707-5 (ed.)
- Morony, Michael G. (2005). "History and Identity in the Syrian Churches". In J.J., van Ginkel; Murre-van den Berg, H.L.; van Lint, T.M. (eds.). Redefining Christian Identity: Cultural Interaction in the Middle East Since the Rise of Islam. Leuven: Peeters Publishers. pp. 1–33. ISBN 978-90-429-1418-6.
- Morony, Michael G. (2007). "For whom does the writer write?: the first bubonic plague pandemic according to Syriac sources". In Little, Lester K. (ed.). Plague and the end of antiquity : the pandemic of 541-750. Cambridge: Cambridge University Press. ISBN 978-0-521-84639-4.
- Morony, Michael G., ed. (2014). Universality in Islamic thought : rationalism, science and religious belief. London: I.B. Tauris. ISBN 9781780769431.
