= List of non-Muslim authors on Islam =

The following is a list of notable non-Muslim authors on Islam.

== Chronological by date of birth ==
=== 622 to 1500 ===
- Sebeos (fl. 651), Armenian historian, documented in his History the rise of Muhammad and the early Muslim conquests.
- Joannis Damasceni (c. 676–749), official of the Caliph at Damascus, later a Syrian monk, Doctor of the Church, his Peri Aireseon [Concerning Heresies] [t], its chapter 100 being "Heresy of the Ishmailites" (attribution questioned).
- Du Huan, captured at 751 Battle of Talas, traveled in Muslim lands for ten years, his Jingxingji [Record of Travels] (c. 770) contains descriptions of Muslim life; book lost, but quoted by his uncle Du You in his Tongdian (766-801), an encyclopedia of China.
- Sankara (c. 788–820) of Kerala, pivotal Hindu reformer; theologian of non-duality, the Advaita Vedanta: a unity of self (atman) and the whole (Brahman); unresolved is the claim that early notions of the Sufi wahdat al-wujud [Oneness of Being] was synthesized by Sankara.
- Abd al-Masih ibn Ishaq al-Kindi, probably 8th/9th century Abbasid, pseudonym [Servant of the Messiah...] of an Arab Christian, author of the Risalah, a dialogue with a Muslim; later translated into Latin by Pedro de Toledo, this work Apology became very influential in Europe.
- Nicetas Byzantius, his 9th century polemic Anatrope tes para tou Arabos... (P.G., v.105) picks at the Qur'an chapter by chapter.
- Mardan-Farrukh of Iran, his late 9th century Sikand-Gumanik Vigar [Doubt-Dispelling Treatise] [t] (S.B.E., v.24) favorably compares his Zoroastrianism, especially its theodicy, with Judaism, Christianity, and Islam, whose doctrines and beliefs are discussed.
- Petrus Venerabilis (c. 1092–1156), Abbot of Cluny (France), while in Hispania circa 1240, inspired a group led by Robert of Ketton (England), with Herman von Carinthia (Slovenia), Pierre de Poitiers (France), and the mozarab Pedro de Toledo to translate the Qur'an into Latin, hence the Lex Mahumet pseudoprophete (1143); it circulated only in manuscript copies until 1543. Often only a tinted paraphrase, later George Sales would say it "deserves not the name of translation" because of its inaccuracy.
- Raimundo, Arzobispo de Toledo (r. 1125–1152) sponsored uncensored translations, at first by Domingo Gundisalvo a mozarab who rendered into Latin the Spanish translations from Arabic by the converso Juan Avendaut; later joined by European scholars, e.g., Gerardo da Cremona. From books found in al-Andalus, e.g., the pagan Aristotle (centuries earlier translated from ancient Greek into Arabic by Syrian Christians), and the Muslims Ibn Sina (Avicenna), al-Ghazali, Ibn Rushd (Averroës); such translations led to controversy & the eventual "baptism" of Aristotle by Tomas d'Aquino at the University of Paris.
- Mose ben Maimon (1135–1204), major Jewish theologian and talmudist who fled Al-Andalus for Morocco, then Cairo, his Dalalat al-Ha'rin [Guide of the Perplexed] (Fostat 1190) [in Arabic] [t], reconciles the Bible and the Talmud with Aristotle, discusses Al-Farabi, Ibn Sina (Avicenna), and the Muslim Kalam, especially the Mutakallimun, as well as the Mutazili; influenced by Ibn Rushd (Averroës).
- Marco de Toledo (fl. 1193–1216) Castile, an improved Latin translation from Arabic of the Qur'an.
- Francesco d'Assisi (1182–1226), Italian saint, as peaceful missionary to Muslims, preached before Al-Kamil, Kurdish Sultan of Egypt, in 1219 during the fifth crusade; his Regula non bullata (1221) [t], chapter XVI "Those who are going among the Saracens and other unbelievers" counsels not to enter disputes, but rather humility, proclaiming what will please God.
- Frederick II (1194–1250), Hohenstaufen Emperor, at whose court in Palermo, Sicily, translations from Arabic into Latin continued.
- Ibn Kammuna (c. 1215-c. 1285), Jewish scholar of Baghdad, his fair-minded though controversial Tanqih al-abhat li-l-milal al-talat [Examination of the Inquiries into the Three Faiths] (1280) [in Arabic] [t].
- Alfonso X el Sabio (1221–1284), Castile, his royal Scriptorium or Escuela de Traductores continued translations from Arabic (especially Greek scientific works and Islamic) into Latin, which then became widely known in Europe; many translators were Jewish.
- Ramon Marti (d. c. 1286) Castilla, Dominican friar, Summa contra errores Alcoranorum (1260); Pugio fidei adversus mauros et judaeos (c. 1280); a traditional partisan, he refers to the Qur'an, Hadith, as well as al-Farabi, Ibn Sina, al-Ghazali, Ibn Rushd.
- Tomás d'Aquino (c. 1225–1274) Italian Dominican, Doctor of the Church ("Angelicus"), his Summa contra Gentiles (c. 1261–64) [t], includes criticism of the Aristotelianism of Ibn Rushd (Averroës); also De Unitate Intellectus Contra Averroistas (Paris 1270) [t].
- Bar 'Ebraya [Abu-l-Farag] (1226–1286), Catholicos of the Syriac Orthodox Church, learned theologian, prolific author, his spiritual treatise in Syriac Kethabha dhe yauna [Book of the Dove], as well as his Ethikon said by Wensinck to show influence by al-Ghazali.
- Ramon Llull [Raimundo Lulio] (1232–1316) Majorcan author and theologian, "Doctor Illuminatus", proponent of the "Ars Magna", fluent in Arabic, three times missionary to Tunis; his Llibre del Gentile e dels tres Savis (1274–76) [t], in which one learned in Hellenic philosophy hears three scholars, Jewish, Christian, and Muslim, whose views are shared with exquisite courtesy by reasoning over their mutual virtues, rather than by attack and defense. Lull infers a heterodox continuum between the natural & the revealed supernatural.
- Riccoldo di Monte Croce (1243–1320) Italian (Firenze) Dominican, a missionary during the 1290s, lived in Baghdad, his Propugnaculum Fidei soon translated into Greek, later into German by Martin Luther; also polemic Contra Legum Serracenorum (Baghdad, c. 1290).
- Ramananda (died 1410) Hindu egalitarian reformer of bhakti movement, origin as Brahmin in sect of Ramanuja; his popular synthesis of both Islamic and Hindu elements led also to inter-religious understanding; the Sant Mat poet Kabir was a disciple.
- Ruy Gonzáles de Clavijo (died 1412), ambassador of Enrique III of Castile to Timur at Samarkand, Embajada a Tamor Lán (1582) [t].
- Nicolaus Cusanus (1401–1464) German Cardinal, at cusp of renaissance; following the fall of Constantinople, his De pace fidei (1455) [t] sought common ground among the various religions, presenting fictitious short dialogues involving an Arab, an Indian, an Assyrian, a Jew, a Scythian, a Persian, a Syrian, a Turk, a Tartar, and various Christians; also his Cribratio Alcorani (1460).
- Nanak (1469–1539) India, influenced by Muslim sufis and Hindu bhakti, became a teacher who traveled far to preach the unity of God; Sikhs revere him as their first Guru; opposed to caste divisions, and opposed to Hindu-Muslim rivalry/conflict.
- Leo Africanus (c.1488–1554), originally Al Hassan, Muslim of Fez; traveled with his diplomat uncle to Timbuktu; later captured by Christian pirates & sold into slavery; freed by Pope Leo X and baptised; wrote Cosmographia Dell'Africa of his travels; returned to Islam.
- => The [t] following a title indicates books translated into English.

=== 1500 to 1800 ===
- Enbaqom (c.1470–1565), Ethiopia, echage or abbot of Dabra Libanos, origin as trader from Yemen; his Anqasa Amin [Gateway of Faith] (c.1533), written in Ge'ez, defends Christianity contra Islam, citing the Qur'an, and is addressed to the Muslim invader Ahmad ibn Ibrahim.
- Theodor Bibliander [Buchmann] (1506–1564), Swiss (Zurich) theologian, in 1543 published in Basel various documents (with a preface by Martin Luther), which included the Lex Mahumet pseudoprophete of 1143.
- Luis de Marmol Carvajal (c. 1520-c. 1600), Spanish soldier in Africa twenty years, captured and enslaved seven years, travels in Guinea, North Africa, Egypt, and perhaps Ethiopia: Descripción general de África (1573, 1599).
- Alonso del Castillo (1520s – c.1607), Spain, formative work in Arabic archives and inscriptions (his father once a Morisco of Granada).
- Andre du Ryer (c. 1580 – c. 1660) France, translation of the Qur'an: L'Alcoran de Mahomet translaté d'arabe en françois (Paris 1647) [t].
- Alexander Ross (1591–1654), Scotland, chaplain to Charles I, first English translation of the Qur'an (1649) from the French of du Ryer.
- Ignazio Lomellini (1560–1645) Jesuit priest from Genoa known for Animadversiones, Notae ac Disputationes in Pestilentem Alcoranum (MS A-IV-4), a 1622 manuscript that is the oldest surviving example of a European translation of the Quran which also includes the complete original Arabic text.
- Ludovico Marracci (1612–1700) Italian priest, professor of Arabic, Latin translation of the Qur'an, Alcorani textus universus... (Padua 1698), publication delayed by Church censors, in two volumes: Prodromus contains a biography of Mohammad and summary of Islamic doctrine; Refutatio Alcorani contains the Qur'an in Arabic text, with Latin translation, annotated per partisan purposes (cf., Ottoman military proximity); cited by Edward Gibbon. Also, his earlier contributions translating the Bible into Arabic (1671).
- Dara Shikuh (1615–1659), Mughal, elder brother of Aurangzeb; Muslim but included here because of his syncretism in the tradition of his great-grandfather Akbar; his Majma-ul-Bahrain [Mingling of Two Oceans] (1655) [t] finds parallels between Sufism and the monotheistic Vedanta of Hinduism, it was later translated into Sanskrit; also his own translation into Persian of the Upanishads.
- Johann Heinrich Hottinger (1620–1667) Swiss philologist, theologian, Historia Orientalis (Tiguri 1651) in Latin.
- Barthelemy d'Herbelot de Molainville (1625–1695) French philologist, Bibliothèque orientale (1697), based initially on the Turkish scholar Katip Celebi's Kashf al-Zunum which contains over 14,000 alphabetical entries.
- Henry Stubbe (1632–1676) English author, his An Account of the rise and progress of Mahometanism: with the life of Mahomet and a vindication of him and his religion from the calumnies of the Christians, which evidently lay in manuscript several hundred years until edited by Mahmud Khan Shairani and published (London: Luzac 1911).
- Jean Chardin (1643–1713) French merchant, Journal du Voyage.. de Chardin en Perse et aux Indes Orientales (1686, 1711) [t].
- Antoine Galland (1646–1715) France, first in the West to translate the Arabian Nights, Les Mille et Une Nuits (1704–1717).
- Humphrey Prideaux (1648–1724) Anglican Dean, traditional partisan, The True Nature of Imposture fully display'd in the Life of Mahomet (London 1697), reprint 1798, Fairhaven, Vermont; this work follows earlier polemics, & also refutes European deists.
- Abraham Hinckelmann (1652–1692), edited an Arabic text of the Qur'an, later published in Hamburg, Germany, in 1694.
- Henri Comte de Boulainviller (1658–1722) French historian, his Vie de Mahomet (2nd ed., Amsterdam 1731) [t], praises what he saw as the instrumental rationalism of the prophet, portraying Islam in terms of a natural religion.
- Liu Zhi (c.1660 – c.1730) Chinese Muslim scholar writing in Chinese (Arabic "Han Kitab", Chinese books); during early Qing, presented Islam to Manchus as consonant with Confucianism, e.g., his Tianfang Dianli dealing with ritual, comparing li with Muslim practice.
- Jean Gagnier (c. 1670–1740) Oxford Univ., De vita et rebus Mohammedis (1723), annotated Latin translation of chapters on Muhammad from Mukhtasar Ta'rikh a-Bashar by Abu 'l-Fida (1273–1331); also La Vie de Mahomet (Amsterdam 1748), biography in French.
- Liu Chih (16wx–17yz) China, T'ien-fang Chih-sheng shi-lu ([1721–1724], 1779), ["True Annals of the Prophet of Arabia"]; I. Mason [t], The Arabian Prophet; A life of Mohammed from Chinese sources (Shanghai 1921).
- Simon Ochley (1678–1720) England, Cambridge Univ., his History of the Saracens (1708, 1718) praises Islam at arm's length.
- Voltaire [Francois-Marie Arouet] (1694–1778) French author, critic, anti-cleric, deist, wealthy speculator; his play Mahomet le prophete ou le fanatisme (1741) [t], invents scurrilous legends & attacks hypocrisy, (also being a hidden attack on the French ancien régime).
- George Sale (1697–1736), English lawyer, using Hinckelmann and Marracci, annotated and translated into English a well regarded The Koran (1734); member of the "Society for Promotion of Christian Knowledge", proofread its Arabic New Testament (S.P.C.K. 1726).
- Miguel Casiri (1710–1780s), Syrian Maronite, Bibliotheca Arabico-Hispana Escurialensis (2 volumes, Madrid 1760–1770).
- Carsten Niebuhr (1733–1815) Germany, member of royal Danish expedition to Yemen, Beschreibung von Arabien (Kobenhavn 1772); Reisebeschreibung nach Arabien und andern umliegenden Landern (3 volumes, Kobenhavn 1774, 1778, Hamburg 1837).
- Silvestre de Sacy (1758–1838) Jewish French, his Grammaire arabe (2v., 1810); teacher of Champollion who read the Rosetta Stone.
- José Antonio Conde (1765–1820) Historia de la dominacion de los arabes en Espana (Madrid 1820–1821), pioneer work now depreciated.
- Ram Mohan Roy [Raja Ram Mohun Roy] (1772–1833), India (Kolkata, Bengal), early journalist, influential religious and social reformer, founder of Brahmo Samaj, his Tuhfat-ul-Muwahhidin [Gift of the Unitarians] (1803–1804), a book in Persian on, e.g., the unity of religions.
- Washington Irving (1783–1859) U.S., author, Minister to Spain 1842–1846, Chronicle of the Conquest of Granada (1829); Tales of the Alhambra (1832, 1851) where he lived several years; Mahomet and His Successors (New York City: Putnam 1849) a popular, fair-minded biography based on translations from Arabic and on western authors, since edited (Univ.of Wisconsin 1970).
- Charles Mills (1788–1826) England, History of Mohammedanism (1818).
- Garcin de Tassy (1794–1878) France, L'Islamisme d'apre le Coran (Paris 1874), the religion based on a reading of the Qur'an.
- Yusuf Ma Dexin (1794–1874) Chinese (Yunnan) Muslim scholar and leader; first to translate the Qur'an into Chinese.
- A. P. Caussin de Perceval (1795–1871) Essai sur l'histoire des Arabes avant l'Islamisme (Paris 1847–1849), Arabia before Muhammad.
- => The [t] following a title indicates books translated into English.

=== 1800 to 1900 ===
- Gustav Leberecht Flügel (1802–1870), Germany, Al-Qoran: Corani textus Arabicus (Leipzig 1834), Arabic text for academics.
- Gustav Weil (1808–1889) Jewish German, Mohammed der Prophet (Stuttgart 1843); Biblische Legenden der Musel-manner (Frankfort 1845) [t]; Das Leben Mohammeds nach Mohammed ibn Ishak, bearbeitet von Abdel Malik ibn Hischam (Stuttgart 1864).
- John Medows Rodwell (1808–1900), English translation of The Koran, using derived chronological sequence of Suras.
- Pascual de Gayangos y Arce (1809–1897), Spanish Arabist, studied under de Sacy in Paris; translated al-Maqqari (d.1632) into English as History of the Mohammedan Dynasties of Spain (1840, 1843); Tratados de Legislación Musulmana (v.5, Mem.His.Esp. 1853).
- Abraham Geiger (1810–1874) German rabbi and scholar, major founder of Reform Judaism, his Was hat Mohammed aus dem Judenthume aufgenommen? (Bonn 1833) [t] restates and updates a perennial thesis (e.g., cf. L. Marracci).
- Aloys Sprenger (1813–1893) Austria, Das Leben und die Lehre des Mohammad (2nd edition, 3 volumes, Berlin 1869).
- Carl Paul Caspari (1814–1892) German, Christian convert from Judaism, Norwegian academic, Grammatica Arabica (1844–48), Latin.
- William Muir (1819–1905), Scotland, government official in India, The Life of Mohamet (London, 1861).
- Edward Rehatsek (1819–1891) Hungary, later India, first translation of Sirah Rasul Allah into English (deposited, 1898).
- Reinhart Dozy (1820–1883) Netherlands, Histoire des Musulmans d'Espagne jusqu'a la Conquete de l'Andalousie par les Almoravides (Leiden, 1861), 4 volumes; Recherches sur l'Histoire et la Littérature de l'Espagne pendant le moyen âge (1881).
- Richard Francis Burton (1821–1890) British, Personal Narrative of a Pilgrimage to al-Madinah and Mecca (2 vol., 1855).
- Ernest Renan (1823–1892) French, Catholic apostate, Histoire generale et system compare des langues semitiques (Paris 1863).
- Friedrich Max Müller (1823–1900) German philologist, comparative religion pioneer, Oxford Univ. professor, editor of 50 volume Sacred Books of the East, volumes 6 and 9 being the Qur'an translated by E. H. Palmer.
- es:Francisco Javier Simonet (1825-c.1897) Spanish Arabist, traditional partisan, Leyendas históricas árabes (Madrid 1858); Historia de los mozarabes de Espana (Madrid 1897–1903); controversial views, e.g., suggests that one-sided Muslim marriage law caused an insulation in the subject people that over generations fused their religious & lineage identities, hence focus put on limpio de sangre.
- Ludolf Krehl (1825–1901) Beitrage zur Muhammedanischen Dogmatik (Leipzig 1885).
- Alfred von Kremer (1828–1889) Austria, professor of Arabic at Wien, foreign service to Cairo, Egypt; Geschichte de herrschenden Ideen des Islams (Leipzig 1868); Culturgeschichte Streifzüge auf dem Gebiete des Islams (Leipzig 1873) [t].
- Girish Chandra Sen (1836–1910) India, translated Muslim works into Bengali, including the Qur'an (1886); professor of Islam for the Brahmo Samaj, universalist Hindu reform society founded in 1828 by Ram Mohan Roy (1772–1833).
- es:Francisco Codera y Zaidín (1836–1917) Tratado numismática arábigo-español (Madrid 1879); founded Bibliotheca Arabico-Hispana.
- Michael Jan de Geoje (1836–1909) Dutch academic, led the editing of the Arabic text of Ta'rikh al-rasul wa'l muluk [History of Prophets and Kings] of the Persian al-Tabari (d. 923), in 14 volumes (Leiden: Brill 1879–1901).
- Theodor Nöldeke (1836–1930) Germany, well regarded philologist and academic, Das Leben Mohammeds (1863); Zur Grammatik de klassische Arabisch (1896); with Friedrich Schwally Geschichte des Qorans (Leipzig, 1909–1919, 2 volumes).
- Edward Henry Palmer (1840–1882), English; traveler in Arab lands; called to the bar in 1874; translated Qur'an for the S.B.E. (1880); killed in Egypt by desert ambush while with British military patrol.
- Ignazio Guidi (1844–1935) Italy, L'Arabe anteislamique (Paris 1921).
- Julius Wellhausen (1844–1918) Germany, Muhammed in Medina (Berlin 1882); Das Arabische Reich und sein Sturz (Berlin 1902); his Prolegomena zur Geschichte Israels (Berlin 1878, 1882) [t] presents studies using the "higher criticism" of the Bible.
- William Robertson Smith (1846–1894) Scotland, Kinship and Marriage in Early Arabia (Cambridge 1885); Lectures on the Religion of the Semites (1889), sought to locate ancient Judaism in its historical context; in his Old Testament studies influenced by Wellhausen.
- Italo Pizzi (1849–1920) L'Islamismo (Milan 1905).
- Ignaz Goldziher (1850–1921), Hungary, Die Zahiriten (Leipzig 1884); Muhammedanische Studien (2 volumes, Halle 1889–1890) [t] {vol.2 questions hadith}; Vorlesungen uber den Islam (Heidelberg 1910, 1925) [t]; Die Richtungen der islamischen Koranauslegung (Leiden 1920); well regarded Jewish scholar, admirer of Islam, e.g., writing that he felt fulfillment when praying with Muslims in a Cairo mosque.
- Herbert Udny Weitbrecht (1851−1937), The Teaching of the Qur’an with an Account of Its Growth and a Subjekt Index, (1919)
- Martijn Theodoor Houtsma (1851–1943) Netherlands, lead editor of Encyclopaedia of Islam (Leiden: E.J.Brill 1913–1938), 9 volumes; eclipsed by a new edition (1954–2002) of 11 volumes with index and supplements.
- Julián Ribera y Tarragó (1858–1934) Spain (Valencia), professor of Arabic, studies in mixed culture of al-Andalus (e.g., connections to the troubadours); El Cancionero de Abencuzmán (Madrid 1912); La musica de las Cantigas (Madrid 1922).
- David Samuel Margoliouth (1858–1940), Anglican, his father a Jewish convert, Mohammed and the Rise of Islam (London 1905, 1923); Relations between Arabs and Israelites prior to the Rise of Islam (1924); Table-talk of a Mesopotamian judge (1921, 1922, 2v).
- William St. Clair Tisdall (1859–1928) Anglican priest, linguist, traditional partisan, The Original Sources of the Quran (S.P.C.K. 1905).
- Edward G. Browne (1862–1926) English, A Literary History of Persia (4 volumes, 1902–1924).
- Henri Lammens (1862–1937) Flemish Jesuit, a modern partisan; Fatima et ls filles de Mahomet (Roma 1912); Le berceau de l'Islam (Roma 1914); L'Islam, croyances et institutions (Beyrouth 1926) [t]; L'Arabe Occidental avant l'Hegire (Beyrouth 1928).
- Henri Pirenne (1862–1935) Belgian historian, Mahomet et Charlemagne (Paris 1937) [t], how the Arab conquests disrupted Mediterranean trade, isolating the European economies which declined.
- Maurice Gaudefroy-Desmombynes (1862–1957) France, Le pelerinage a la Mekke (Paris 1923); Le monde musulman et byzantin jusqu'aux croisades (Paris 1931) with S.F.Platonov; Les institutions musulmanes (Paris 1946) [t].
- Duncan Black MacDonald (1863–1943) Scotland; Hartford Seminary in U.S.; Development of Muslim Theology, Jurisprudence and Constitutional Theory (New York 1903); The Religious Attitude and Life in Islam (Chicago 1909).
- Friedrich Zacharias Schwally (1863–1919), Germany; student of Theodor Nöldeke; Ibraham ibn Muhammed el-Baihaqi Kitab el Mahdsin val Masdwi (Leipzig 1899–1902); Kitab al-mahasin vai-masavi (Gießen 1902).
- Thomas Walker Arnold (1864–1930) England, professor in India associating with Shibli Nomani & Muhammad Iqbal, later at London S.O.A.S.; The Caliphate (Oxford 1924); Painting in Islam. A study of the place of pictorial art in Muslim culture (1928); The Preaching of Islam (1929); Legacy of Islam (Oxford 1931) editor with A. Guillaume.
- Miguel de Unamuno (1864–1936) Spain, philosopher; embraced Spanish connection to Berber North Africa but not to the Arabs.
- François Nau (1864–1913) Les chrétiens arabes en Mesopotamia et en Syrie au VIIe et VIIIe siècles (Paris 1933).
- William Ambrose Shedd (1865–1918) U.S., Presbyterian, Islam and the Oriental Churches: Their historical relations (1904).
- Marshall Broomhall (1866–1937) British, Protestant missionary to China, Islam in China. A neglected problem (1910).
- Theodor Juynboll (1866–1948) Handbuch des islamischen Gesetzes (Leipzig: Brill Harrassowitz 1910) on Islamic law.
- Samuel Marinus Zwemer (1867–1952) U.S., Dutch Reform missionary to Islam, later at Princeton, Islam. A Challenge to Faith (NY 1907); Law of Apostasy in Islam (1924).
- Leon Walerian Ostroróg, Comte (1867–1932) Poland, The Angora Reform (London 1927), on the "Law of Fundamental Organization" (1921) of republican Turkey transferring power from the Sultan to the Assembly; Pour la réforme de la justice ottomane (Paris 1912).
- Gertrude Bell (1868–1926) English, Persian Pictures (1894); Syria: The desert and the sown (1907); became a British political officer in Arab lands during World War I.
- Reynold Nicholson (1868–1945) English, The Mystics of Islam (1914); A Literary History of the Arabs (Cambridge Univ. 1930).
- Carl Brockelmann (1868–1956) Geschichte der arabischen Literatur (5 vol., Weimar & Leiden, 1898–1942), Geschichte der islamischen Volker und Staaten (Munchen 1939) [t].
- Ramón Menéndez Pidal (1869–1968), Spain, elaborates Ribera and Asín. España, eslabón entre la cristiandad y el islam (1956) [t].
- Leone Caetani (1869–1935) Italian nobleman, Annali dell'Islam (10 volumes, 1904–1926) reprint 1972, contains early Arabic sources.
- Mohandas Karamchand "Mahatma" Gandhi (1869–1948) spiritual and independence leader in India, opposed caste divisions; prolific writer, teacher of satyagraha worldwide, influencing Martin Luther King Jr.; his letter to Mohammad Ali Jinnah of Sept. 11, 1944, stated "My life mission has been Hindu-Muslim unity... not to be achieved without the foreign ruling power being ousted." Because of policies favorable to Islam, Gandhi was assassinated by a Hindu ultra-nationalist. Cf., McDonough, Gandhi's responses to Islam (New Delhi 1994).
- Miguel Asín Palacios (1871–1944), Catholic priest, professor of Arabic, studied the mutuality of influence between Christian and Islamic spirituality (prompting vigorous response), Algazel (Zaragoza 1901); La escatologia musulmana en la Divina Comedia (Madrid 1923) ["t"] per influence on Dante of mi'raj literature; El Islam cristianizado. Estudio del sufismo a traves de las obras de Abenarabi de Murcia (Madrid 1931); Huellas del Islam (Madrid 1941) includes comparative articles on Tomas d'Aquino and Juan de las Cruz.
- De Lacy O'Leary (1872–1957) Bristol Univ. Arabic Thought and Its Place in History (1922, 1939); Comparative Grammar of the Semitic Languages (1923); Arabia before Muhammad (1927); How Greek Science passed to the Arabs (1949).
- Georg Graf (1875–1955) Germany, Geschichte der Christlichen Arabischen Literatur (Vatican 1944).
- Richard Bell (1876–1952) British, Origin of Islam in its Christian Environment (Edinburgh Univ. 1925).
- Arthur S. Tritton (1881–1973) The Caliphs and their Non-Muslim Subjects. A critical study of the Covenant of 'Umar (Oxford 1930).
- Alphonse Mingana (1881–1937) Assyrian Christian (Iraq), former priest, religious historian, collected early Syriac and Arabic documents and books into the "Mingana Collection".
- Julian Morgenstern (1881–1976) U.S., Rites of Birth, Marriage, Death and Kindred Occasions among the Semites (Cincinnati 1966).
- Arent Jan Wensinck (1882–1939) Dutch, Mohammed en de Joden te Medina (Amsterdam 1908) [t]; La pensee de Ghazzali (Paris 1940); Handworterbuch des Islam (1941) [t] with J. H. Kramers; from Syriac, Bar Hebraeus's Book of the Dove (Leyden 1919).
- Louis Massignon (1883–1962) France, influenced Catholic-Islamic understanding per the Nostra aetate of Vatican II (1962–1965); a married priest (Orthodox [Arabic rite]), Essai sur les origines du lexique technique de la mystique musulmane (Paris 1922, 2nd ed. 1954) [t]; Passion de Husayn Ibn Mansur Hallaj (Paris 1973) [t].
- José Ortega y Gasset (1883–1955) Spain, philosopher; like Unamuno opposed modern trend to incorporate into Spanish historiography the positive Islamic element. Abenjaldún nos revela el secreto (1934), about Ibn Khaldun.
- Nicolas P. Aghnides (1883–19xx) Mohammedan Theories of Finance (Columbia Univ. 1916).
- Margaret Smith (1884–1970) Rabi'a the mystic and her fellow saints in Islam (Cambridge Univ. 1928); Studies in Early Mysticism in the Near and Middle East (1931) development of early Christian mysticism, of Islamic re Sufism, and a comparison.
- Seymour Gonne Vesey-FitzGerald (1884–1954), Muhammadan Law, an abridgement, according to its various schools (Oxford Univ. 1931); The Iraq Treaty, 1930 (London 1932).
- Tor Andrae (1885–1947), Sweden, Univ.of Uppsala, history of religion, comparative religion; Mohammed. Sein Leben und Sein Glaube (Göttingen 1932) [t]; I myrtenträdgarden: Studier i tidig islamisk mystik (Stockholm: Albert Bonniers Forlag 1947) [t].
- Américo Castro (1885–1972) Spain, reinterpreted Spanish history by integrating Muslim and Jewish contributions. España en su historia: Cristianos, moros y judíos (1948) [t]; Sobre el nombre y quién de los españoles: cómo llegaron a serlo (1973).
- Philip Khuri Hitti (1886–1978) Lebanon, formative re Arabic studies in the U.S., Origins of the Islamic State (Columbia Univ. 1916) annotated translation of Kitab Futuh Al-Buldan of al-Baladhuri; History of Syria, including Lebanon and Palestine (1957).
- Shūmei Ōkawa (1886–1957) Japanese author activist; pan-Asian modern partisan, pro-India since 1913 (criticized per China by Gandhi in 1930s); indicted at Tokyo War Crimes Tribunal for his "clash of civilizations" view; translation of Qur'an into Japanese (1950).
- Giorgio Levi Della Vida (1886–1967) Jewish Italian, professor of semitic languages, Storia e religione nell'Oriente semitico (Roma 1924); Les Sémites et leur rôle das l'histoire religieuse (Paris 1938); anti-Fascist Italian politician in 1920s.
- Gonzangue Ryckmans (1887–1969) Belgium, Catholic priest, Louvain professor, epigraphy of pre-Islamic South Arabia; Les Religions Arabes preislamiques (Louvain 1951).
- Harry Austryn Wolfson (1887–1974) U.S., Harvard Univ., Philo. Foundations of Religious Philosophy in Judaism, Christianity, and Islam (1947); The Philosophy of the Kalam (1976); Repercussions of the Kalam in Jewish Philosophy (1979).
- Alfred Guillaume (1888–1966) England, Life of Muhammad (Oxford 1955) annotated translation of Ibn Ishaq's Sirat Rasul Allah, an early "biography" of the prophet (as transmitted by Ibn Hisham); Legacy of Islam (Oxford 1931) co-editor with T. W. Arnold.
- es:Ángel González Palencia (1889–1949) Spanish Arabist, História de la España musulmana (Barcelona 1925, 3rd ed 1932); História de la literatura arábigo-española (Barcelona 1928, 1945); Moros y cristianos in España medieval. Estudios históricos-literarios (1945).
- Arthur Jeffery (1892–1959) American University at Cairo 1921–1938, Materials for the history of the text of the Quran (Leiden 1937–1951); Foreign Vocabulary in the Quran (Baroda 1938); A Reader on Islam (1962).
- Barend ter Haar (1892–1941) Dutch, Beginselen en Stelsel van het Adatrecht (Groningen Batavia 1939) [t], on Adat law in Indonesia.
- Olaf Caroe (1892–1981) a former governor of the area, The Pathans. 550 B.C. - A.D. 1957 (London 1958).
- Freya Stark (1893–1993) English, Valley of the Assassins (1934) about NW Iran; The Southern Gates of Arabia. A journey in the Hadhramaut (1936); A winter in Arabia (1939).
- Willi Heffening (1894–19xx) Germany, Das islamische fremdenrecht zu den islamisch-fränkischen staatsverträgen. Eine rechtshistorischen studie zum fiqh (Hanover 1925).
- Évariste Lévi-Provençal (1894–1956) France, Histoire de l'Espagne musulmane, 711-1031 (3 volumes, Paris-Leiden 1950–1953).
- E. A. Belyaev (1895–1964) Russia (USSR), Araby, Islam i arabskii Khalifat (Moskva, 2nd ed 1966) [t].
- Henri Terrasse (1895–1971) French Arabist, Histoire du Maroc (2 volumes, Casablanca 1949–1950) [t]; Islam d'Espagne (Paris 1958).
- Morris S. Seale (1896–1993) Muslim Theology. A Study of Origins with Reference to the Church Fathers (London: Luzac 1964).
- Gerald de Gaury (1897–1984) English soldier, Rulers of Mecca (New York, c.1950).
- José López Ortiz (1898–1992) Spain, Arabist with interest in legal history; article on fatwas of Granada; Los Jurisconsultos Musulmanes (El Escorial, 1930); Derecho musulman (Barcelona, 1932); a Catholic priest, later made Bishop.
- Enrico Cerulli (1898–1988) Italy, Documenti arabi per la storia nell' Etiopia (Roma 1931); his two works re Dante and Islam per M. Asín: Il "Libro della scala" e la question delle fonti arabo-spagnole della Divina commedia (Vatican 1949), Nuove ricerche sul "Libro della Scala" e la conoscenza dell'Islam in Occidente (Vatican 1972).
- => The [t] following a title indicates books translated into English.

=== 1900 to 1950s ===
- Claude L. Pickens (1900–1985), professor of Chinese at Harvard University, Annotated Bibliography of Literature on Islam in China (Hankow: Society of Friends of the Moslems in China 1950).
- Josef Schacht (1902–1969) France (Alsace), Islamic legal history, Der Islam (Tübingen 1931); Origins of Muhammadan Jurisprudence (Oxford 1950) influential work, a legal historical critique (following, e.g., Goldziher) the early oral transmission of Hadith & founding jurists; Introduction to Islamic Law (Oxford 1964); Legacy of Islam (2nd ed., Oxford 1974) edited with C. E. Bosworth.
- J. Spencer Trimingham (1904–1987) English; Islam in Ethiopia (Oxford 1952), history and sociology; Sufi Orders in Islam (Oxford 1971); Christianity among the Arabs in Pre-Islamic Times (Beirut 1990).
- Erwin Rosenthal (1904–1991) German, Political Thought in Medieval Islam (1958); Judaism and Islam (1961).
- Arthur John Arberry (1905–1969) English, The Koran Interpreted (1955), a translation that attempts to capture the medium of the original Arabic; various other translations; Sufism. An Account of the Mystics of Islam (1950).
- Emilio García Gómez (1905–1995) Spain, Arabist, poet; Poemas arabigoandaluces (Madrid 1940); Poesia arabigoandaluza (Madrid 1952); his theories, e.g., on origins of the muwashshahat (popular medieval strophic verse); his admired translations from Arabic.
- Henri Laoust (1905–1983) France, Essai sur les doctrines sociales et politiques de Taki-d-Din Ahmad Taimiya, cononiste 'anbalite (Cairo 1939); Le traite de droit public d'Ibn Taimiya [al-Siyasah al-Shariyah] (Beirut 1948); Le politique de Gazali (Paris 1970).
- Geo Widengren (1907–1996) Sweden, comparative religion; Muhammad, The Apostle of God, and His Ascension (Uppsala 1955).
- Henry Corbin (1907–1978) France, associated with Eranos Institute (inspired by Carl Jung), an academic in history of religions; Les Motifs zoroastriens dans la philosophie de Suhrawardi (Tehran 1948); Avicenne et la recit vissionaire (Tehran 1954) [t]; L'imagination creatrice dans le soufisme d'Ibn 'Arabi (Zurich 1955–56, Paris 1958) [t]; Terre celeste et corps de resurrection: de l'Iran mazdeen a l'Iran shi'ite (Paris 1960) [t].
- Neal Robinson (1908–1983) academic, Christ in Islam and Christianity (SUNY 1991), study of Islamic commentaries and interpretations.
- James Norman Dalrymple Anderson (1908–1994) U.K., Islamic law at S.O.A.S., Islamic Law in Africa (H.M.S.O., 1954); Islamic Law in the Modern World (New York University, 1959); Law Reform in the Muslim World (Athlone, 1976).
- Abraham Katsh (1908–1998) US academic, Judaism in Islam. Biblical and Talmudic backgrounds of the Koran and its Commentators, Sura I & II (New York 1954), reprinted 1962 as Judaism and the Koran.
- William Montgomery Watt (1909–2006) Muhammad at Mecca (Oxford 1953), Muhammad at Medina (Oxford, 1956); with P. Cachia A History of Islamic Spain (Edinburgh 1965); Formative Period of Islamic Thought (1998).
- Claude Cahen (1909–1991) France, Introduction a l'histoire du monde musulman medieval, VIIe-XVIe siecle (Paris 1983).
- Józef Bielawski (1910–1997) University of Warsaw, former Polish diplomat to Turkey; Historia lieratury arabskiej: zarys (Wrocław 1968); translation of Qur'an into Polish (Warsaw 1986), improving on that of J.M.T.Buczacki (1858).
- Jacques Berque (1910 Algeria - 1995 France), pied-noir scholar who early favored Maghribi independence, he retained his ties to Africa; Moroccan Berber ethnology: Les structures sociales du Haut Atlas (1955); Arab renaissance: Les Arabes d'hier a demain (1960) [t].
- Geoffrey Parrinder (1910-2005) comparative religion, Jesus in the Qur'an (London 1965), reprint Oneworld 1995.
- Wilfred Thesiger (1910–2003) England; Arabian Sands (New York 1959), on late 1940s explorations by camel of the "empty quarter" Ar-Rab' Al-Khali; The Marsh Arabs (London 1964), on the rural people of southern Iraq.
- Ann K. S. Lambton (1912-2008) English, State and Government in medieval Islam (1981); Continuity and Change in medieval Persia. Aspects of administrative, economic and social history, 11th–14th century (1988).
- Giulio Basetti-Sani (1912-2001) Italy, Mohammed et Saint François (Ottawa 1959); Per un dialogo cristiano-musulmano (Milano 1969).
- Kenneth Cragg (1913-2012) U.S., The Call of the Minaret (Oxford 1956; 2d Orbis 1985); The Arab Christian (Westm./Knox 1991).
- George Hourani (1913–1984) Lebanese English, Averroes. On the Harmony of Religion and Philosophy (London 1961) annotated translation of Kitab fasl al maqal of Ibn Rushd; Reason and Tradition in Islamic Ethics (Cambridge Univ. 1985); Arab Seafaring in the Indian Ocean in ancient and medieval times (Princeton Univ. 1951, 1995).
- Uriel Heyd [Heydt] (1913–1968) German, later Israeli, Studies in old Ottoman criminal Law (Oxford 1973).
- Robert Charles Zaehner (1913–1974) religious studies at Oxford, The Comparison of Religions (London 1958); Hindu and Muslim Mysticism (London 1960); Concordant Discord: The Interdependence of Faiths (Oxford 1970).
- Franz Rosenthal (1914-2003) Fortleben der Antike im Islam (Zurich 1965); Muslim intellectual and social history (Variorum 1990).
- Toshihiko Izutsu (1914–1993) Japan, Ethico-Religious Concepts in the Qur'an (1959, 1966); Sufism and Taoism (Berkeley 1984).
- Igor Mikhailovich Diakonov (1914–1999) USSR/Russia, historian, linguistics, Semitokhamitskie iazyki [Semito-Hamitic languages] (Moskva 1965) [t]; Afraziiskie iazyki [Afrasian languages] (Moskva 1988) [t]; both on history and description of Afroasiatic languages.
- Joseph Greenberg (1915–2001) U.S., Stanford Univ., linguistic anthropology; in historical linguistics use of his mass lexical comparison to establish language families; Languages of Africa (1966) coined "Afroasiatic" to replace "Hamito-Semitic" for it includes as equal branches Ancient Egyptian, Berber, Chadic, and Cushitic, as well as Semitic; also his recent book on Eurasiatic; cf. Nostratic.
- Albert Hourani (1915–1993) UK, Minorities in the Arab World (Oxford 1947); Arabic Thought in the Liberal Age, 1798–1939 (1962) on the Arab nahda [revival]; Political Society in Lebanon (MIT 1986); A History of the Arab Peoples (1991, Harvard 2002); brother of George Hourani.
- Maxime Rodinson (1915–2004) French Marxist, Mahomet (Paris 1961) [t] as understood with empathy by an atheist; Islam et capitalisme (Paris 1966) [t]; Israel et le refus arabe (Paris 1968).
- Bernard Lewis (1916-2018) British-American, Arabs in History (1950); Muslim Discovery of Europe (1982, 2001); What went Wrong? The Clash between Islam and Modernity in the Middle East (2002).
- George Makdisi (1920–2002) U.S., Islamic studies, Rise of Colleges. Institutions of Learning in Islam and the West (Edinburgh Univ. 1981); Rise of Humanism in Classical Islam and the Christian West (Edinburgh Univ. 1990).
- Marshall Hodgson (1922–1968) U.S., The Venture of Islam (3 volumes, Univ.of Chicago [1958], 1961, 1974); The Order of the Assassins (The Hague: Mouton 1955); Rethinking World History. Essays on Europe, Islam... (Cambridge Univ. 1993).
- Annemarie Schimmel (1922–2003) Germany, specialist in Sufism, Die Bildersprache Dschelaladdin Rumi (Walldorf 1949); Mevlana Celalettin Rumi'nin sark ve garpta tesirleri (Ankara 1963); Mystical Dimensions of Islam (Univ.of N.Carolina 1975).
- Sabatino Moscati (1922–1997>) Italy, Semitic studies, Le antiche civiltà semitiche (Milano 1958) [t]; I Fenici e Cartagine (Turin 1972).
- Bogumił Witalis Andrzejewski (1922–1994), Poland, linguistics at S.O.A.S. in London; Islamic literature in Somalia (Indiana Univ. 1983); formulator of Latin alphabet for Somali; also work in Oromo, another East Cushitic language, of the Afroasiatic language family.
- Donald Leslie (1922-2004>) Australia, Islamic Literature in China, late Ming and early Ch'ing (1981); Islam in Traditional China (1986).
- Ernest Gellner (1925–1995) London Sch.of Econ., Saints of the Atlas (London 1969); Muslim Society: Essays (Cambridge 1981).
- Leonard Binder (1927->) Univ.of Chicago, Religion and Politics in Pakistan (Univ.of California 1961).
- Francis E. Peters (1927->) U.S.; Aristotle Arabus (Leiden: Brill 1968); Jerusalem and Mecca (NYU 1986); Muhammad and the Origins of Islam (SUNY 1994); Arabs and Arabia on the Eve of Islam (Ashgate 1999).
- John K. Cooley (1927-2008) U.S. journalist, long time coverage of Arab world, An Alliance against Babylon (Univ.of Michigan 2006); Unholy Wars. Afghanistan, America and International Terrorism (2001); Baal, Christ, and Mohammed. Religion and Revolution in North Africa (1965); collaboration with E. W. Said (2002).
- Fredrik Barth (1928-2016>) Political Leadership among the Swat Pathans (Univ.of London 1959).
- Aram Ter-Ghevondyan (1928–1988), Armenian historian; The Arab Emirates in Bagratid Armenia (Yerevan, 1965) [t], historical, political, and social study on the Bagratuni Kingdom of Armenia (885–1045) and its relations with Byzantium and the Arab Emirates; Armenia and the Arab Caliphate (Армения и apaбcкий Халифат) (Yerevan, 1977).
- Speros Vryonis (1928->) U.S., U.C.L.A., The Decline of Medieval Hellenism in Asia Minor and the Process of Islamization from the Eleventh through the Fifteenth Century (Univ. California 1971); Studies on Byzantium, Seljuks and Ottomans (Malibu 1981).
- John Wansbrough (1928–2002) U.S., Islamic studies at S.O.A.S., reinterpretation of Islamic origins, Quranic Studies (Oxford 1977), Sectarian Milieu (Oxford 1978).
- Noel J. Coulson (1928–1986) U.K., Islamic law at S.O.A.S., History of Islamic Law (Edinburgh Univ. 1964); Conflict and Tensions in Islamic Jurisprudence (Univ.of Chicago 1969); Succession in the Muslim Family (Cambridge Univ. 1971); Commercial Law in the Gulf States: The Islamic Legal Tradition (Graham & Trotman 1984).
- J. Hoeberichts (1929->) Dutch, Franciscus en de Islam (Assen: Van Gorcum 199x) [t]; formerly a theology professor in Karachi.
- Wilferd Madelung (1930->) Germany, The Succession to Muhammad (Cambridge Univ. 1997); studies on the Shia.
- Jacob Neusner (1932-2016>) U.S., Comparing Religions through Law: Judaism and Islam (1999) with T.Sonn; Judaism and Islam in Practice (1999) editor, with T.Sonn & J.E.Brockopp; Three Faiths, One God (2003) with B. Chilton & W. Graham.
- Edward W. Said (1935–2003) Palestinian-American, academic, Columbia Univ.; Orientalism (New York 1978); collaborations with Christopher Hitchens (1988), Noam Chomsky (1999), John K. Cooley (2002).
- William Chittick (c.1943->) U.S., collaborations with Seyyed Hossein Nasr and Allameh Tabatabaei in Iran; A Shi'ite Anthology (SUNY 1981); Sufi Path of Love (SUNY 1983) text and commentary on Rumi; Sufi Path of Knowledge (SUNY 1989) on Ibn Arabi; Imaginal Worlds. Ibn al-'Arabi and the Problem of Religious Diversity (SUNY 1994).
- Sachiko Murata (c.1943->), Japan, Tao of Islam. A sourcebook on gender relationships in Islamic thought (SUNY 1992); Chinese Gleams of Sufi Light (SUNY 2000) with her translations from Chinese, and those from Persian by W. Chittick, her spouse.
- Richard E. Rubenstein (1938->) U.S., professor of conflict resolution, Alchemists of Revolution. Terrorists in the modern world (1987); Aristotle's Children. How Christians, Muslims, & Jews rediscovered ancient wisdom & illuminated the Dark Ages (2003).
- Robert Simon (1939->) Hungary, Meccan Trade and Islam. Problems of origin and structure (Budapest 1989); Qur'an translation (1987).
- Michael Cook (1940->) English, Studies in the Origins of Early Islamic Culture and Tradition (2004); with P. Crone, Hagarism (1977).
- Roy Parviz Mottahedeh (1940->) U.S., Loyalty and Leadership in an Early Islamic Society (Princeton University Press 1980), :The Mantle of the Prophet (Simon and Schuster, 1985).
- John L. Esposito (1940->) U.S., Islam. The Straight Path (Oxford 1988); editor-in-chief Oxford Encyclopedia of the Modern Islamic World (4 volumes, 1995); Islam and Civil Society (European Univ. Inst. 2000).
- Malise Ruthven (1942->) Scotland, Islam in the World (Oxford Univ. 1984); Fury for God. Islamist attack on America (Granta 2002).
- Mark R. Cohen (1943->) Princeton Univ., Jewish Self-Government in Medieval Egypt (1980); Under Crescent & Cross (1994).
- William A. Graham (1943->) U.S., Harvard University, "Divine Word and Prophetic Word in Early Islam" (Mouton, 1977); "Beyond the Written Word" (Cambridge, 1986); "Islamic and Comparative Religious Studies" (Ashgate, 2010)
- Gerald R. Hawting (1944->) with Wansbrough at S.O.A.S., The First Dynasty of Islam: The Umayyad Caliphate AD 661-750 (1986, 2000); The Idea of Idolatry and the Rise of Islam: From polemic to history (Cambridge Univ. 1999).
- Karen Armstrong (1944->) English author; Muhammad, a Biography of the Prophet (San Francisco, 1993); Jerusalem: one city, three faiths (1997); A History of God (New York, 1999); "Islam: A Short History" (2002).
- Fred M. Donner (1945->) U.S., Narratives of Islamic Origins: The Beginnings of Islamic Historical Writings (1998).
- Patricia Crone (1945-2015) Denmark, professor in England & U.S., God's Rule : Government and Islam (New York 2004), on political thought; Meccan Trade and the Rise of Islam (1989); Roman, Provincial and Islamic Law (Cambridge Univ. 1987), as sources of Islamic jurisprudence; with M. Cook, Hagarism: The Making of the Islamic World (Cambridge Univ. 1977) following Wansbrough, sets forth the thesis that a multivalent sect of Judaic dissenters predated Muhammad and contributed to the Qur'an.
- Daniel Pipes (1949–>) U.S., Hoover Inst., historian, political commentator; In the Path of God: Islam and Political Power (1983, 2002).
- Norman Calder (1950–1998) Studies in Early Muslim Jurisprudence (Oxford 1993), analysis of early Islamic legal texts.
- Carl W. Ernst (1950–>) Islamic studies, Univ.of N.Carolina, Eternal Garden: Mysticism, History and Politics at a South Asian Sufi Center (1993); Shambhala Guide to Sufism (1997); Following Muhammad. Rethinking Islam in the contemporary world (2003).
- Daniel Martin Varisco (1951–>) U.S., Medieval Agriculture and Islamic Science: The Almanac of a Yemeni Sultan (Univ.of Washington 1994).
- François Déroche (1952–>) France, Professor at the Collège de France, The Abbasid Tradition: Qur ̓ans of the 8th to 10th Centuries (1992); Scribes et manuscrits du Moyen-Orient (1997); Manuel de codicologie des manuscrits en écriture arabe (2000).
- María Rosa Menocal (1953–1912) U.S., her The Arabic Role in Medieval Literary History (Univ.of Pennsylvania 1987).
- Kim Ho-dong (1954->) Korea, Holy War in China. Muslim Rebellion and State in Chinese Central Asia 1864–1877 (Stanford U., 2004).
- => The [t] following a title indicates books translated into English.

== Chronological by date of publication ==
- Austin Kennett England, Bedouin Justice. Law and Custom among the Egyptian Bedouin (Cambridge Univ. 1925).
- David Santillana Italy, Istituzioni di Diritto musulmano malichita (Roma 1926, 1938), 2 volumes, on Islamic law, Maliki school.
- Chin Chi-t'ang China, Chung-kuo hui-chiao shih yen-chiu [Studies in the History of Chinese Islam] (1935).
- Ugo Monneret de Villard Italian academic, Lo Studio dell' Islam in Europa nel XII e nel XIII secolo (Vatican 1944).
- José Muñoz Sendino Spanish academic, La Escala de Mahoma (Madrid 1949), on mi'raj literature re Dante and Islam per M. Asín.
- Jacques Ryckmans Belgium, Leuven Univ. professor, L'institution monarchique en Arabie meridionale avant l'Islam (Louvain 1951); Textes du Yemen antique (Louvain-la-Neuve 1994); nephew of Gonzangue Ryckmans.
- Miguel Cruz Hernandez, Univ.of Salamanca, Filosofia Hispano-musulmana (Madrid 1957), 2 volumes.
- Joseph Chelhod Introduction a la Sociologie de l'Islam. De l'animisme a l'universalisme (Paris 1958).
- Norman Daniel Islam and the West. The making of an image (Edinburgh Univ. 1960).
- Jean Jacques Waardenburg L'Islam dans le miroir de l'Occident (Paris 1962), cultural review of various western scholars of Islam: Goldziher, Hurgronje, Becker, Macdonald, Massignon.
- James T. Monroe U.S., Univ.of California at Berkeley; Islam and the Arabs in Spanish Scholarship (Leiden: E. J. Brill 1970, Reprint, Cambridge: ILEX Editions/Harvard UP 2021); Hispano-Arabic Poetry (Univ.of Calif. 1974, reprint Gorgias 2004); with Benjamin M. Liu, Ten Hispano-Arabic Strophic Songs (U.C. 1989).
- Abraham L. Udovitch U.S., Partnership and Profit in Medieval Islam (Princeton Univ. 1970).
- Cristobal Cuevas El pensamiento del Islam. Contenido e Historia. Influencia en la Mistica espanola (Madrid 1972).
- Nilo Geagea Lebanese priest, Maria nel messagio coranico (Roma 1973) [t], study of texts and of a meeting point between religions.
- Victor Segesvary Swiss, L'Islam et la Reforme (Univ.de Genève 1973).
- Federico Corriente Spain, Las mu'allaqat: antologia y panorama de Arabia preislamica (Madrid: Instituto Hispano-arabe de cultura 1974), annotated translation of well-known collection of popular poetry in Arabia prior to Muhammad.
- Hava Lazarus-Yafeh, Hebrew Univ.of Jerusalem, her Studies in Al-Ghazzali (Jerusalem 1975); Intertwined Worlds. Medieval Islam and Bible Criticism (Princeton Univ. 1992); Islam-Yahadut: Yahadut-Islam (Tel Aviv 2003).
- Bat Ye'or (Gisele Orebi Littman), British author, Jewish refugee (in 1958 thousands expelled by Egypt as reprisal for Lavon Affair); her Hebrew pen name "Daughter of the Nile"; modern partisan; Le Dhimmi (Genève 1980) [t]; Les Chretientes d'Orient entre Jihad et Dhimmitude (Paris 1991) [t]; Eurabia: The Euro-Arab Axis (2006).
- G. W. Bowersock U.S., Princeton Univ., Roman Arabia (Harvard Univ. 1983), Nabataea (now Jordan) to 4th century.
- William Chittick U.S., SUNY Stony Brook, Sufi Path of Love. Spiritual teachings of Rumi (1983); Sufi Path of Knowledge. Ibn Arabi's Metaphysics of Imagination (1989); with Sachiko Murata and Tu Weiming, The Sage Learning of Liu Zhi: Islamic Thought in Confucian Terms (2009).
- Antoine El-Gemayel, Lebanon, The Lebanese Legal System 2 vol. (International Law Inst., Georgetown Univ. 1985), editor.
- Luce López-Baralt Puerto Rico academic, her San Juan de la Cruz y el Islam (Colegio de Mexico, Univ.de Puerto Rico 1985; Madrid 1990); Huellas del Islam en la literatura espanola (Madrid 1985, 1989) [t]; influenced by Miguel Asín Palacios.
- Joseph Cuoq France, L'Islam en Ethiopie des origines au XVIe siecle (Paris 1981); Islamisation de la Nubie Chretienne (Paris 1986).
- George E. Irani Lebanon, U.S., The Papacy and the Middle East. The Role of the Holy See in the Arab-Israeli Conflict, 1962–1984 (Univ.of Notre Dame 1986), e.g., the effect of Vatican II on Church policy.
- Lisa Anderson U.S. academic, The State and Social Transformation in Tunisia and Libya, 1830–1980 (Princeton Univ. 1986).
- David Stephen Powers Studies in Qur'an and Hadith. The Formation of the Islamic Law of Inheritance (Univ.of California 1986).
- David B. Burrell U.S., Knowing the Unknowable God: Ibn-Sina, Maimonides, Aquinas (Univ.of Notre Dame 1986).
- Masataka Takeshita Japan, Ibn 'Arabi's Theory of the Perfect Man and its Place in the History of Islamic Thought (Tokyo 1987).
- Heribert Busse, Univ.of Kiel, Theologischen Beziehungen des Islams zu Judentum und Christentum (Darmstadt 1988) [t], which discusses Muhammad, as well as the narratives found in the Qur'an about the Old Testament and the New Testament.
- R. Stephen Humphreys U.S., Islamic History: a framework for inquiry (Minneapolis 1988); Tradition and innovation in the study of Islamic history. The evolution of North American scholarship since 1960 (Tokyo 1998).
- Jean-François Breton, L'Arabie heureuse au temps de la reine de Saba: Viii-I siècles avant J.-C. (Paris 1988) [t].
- Claude Addas France, her Ibn 'Arabi ou La quete du Soufre Rouge (Paris: Editions Gallimard 1989) [t].
- Julian Baldick, Univ. of London, Mystical Islam (1989); Black God. Afroasiatic roots of Jewish, Christian, & Muslim religions (1998).
- Harald Motzki Germany, Die Anfange der islamischen Jurisprudenz (Stuttgart 1991) [t], by his review of early legal texts, provides a moderate challenge to Schacht's criticism of Hadith & the origins of Islamic law.
- Jacob Lassner, Northwestern Univ.; Demonizing the Queen of Sheba. Boundaries of gender and culture in postbiblical Judaism and medieval Islam (Univ.of Chicago 1993).
- Haim Gerber Hebrew Univ.of Jerusalem, State, Society and Law in Islam. Ottoman Law in Comparative Perspective (SUNY 1994).
- Brannon M. Wheeler (1965–>) U.S., Applying the Canon in Islam. The Authorization and Maintenance of Interpretive Reasoning in Hanafi Scholarship (SUNY 1996).
- G. H. A. Juynboll Dutch, Studies on the Origin and Uses of Islamic Hadith ("Variorum" 1996).
- Michael Dillon, China's Muslims (Oxford Univ. 1996); China's Muslim Hui Community. Migration, Settlement, and Sects (London 1999).
- Robert G. Hoyland Oxford Univ., Seeing Islam as Others Saw It. A Survey and Evaluation of Christian, Jewish, and Zoroastrian Writings on early Islam (Darwin 1997); Arabia and the Arabs: From the Bronze Age to the Coming of Islam (Routledge 2001).
- Christopher Melchert U.S., The Formation of the Sunni Schools of Law (New York: Brill 1999); Ahmad Ibn Hanbal (2006), re Hanbali.
- Christoph Luxenberg (a pseudonym), Die Syro-Aramäische Lesart des Koran: Ein Beitrag zur Entschlüssenlung de Koransprache (Berlin 2000, 2007), employs historic Aramaic to elucidate the Arabic texts.
- Herbert Berg, Univ.of N.Carolina, Philosophy & Religion, The Development of Exegesis in Early Islam. The Debate over authenticity of Muslim literature from the formative period (Routledge/Curzon 2000).
- Knut S. Vikor, Univ.of Bergen, Norway; Between God and the Sultan. A History of Islamic Law (Oxford Univ. 2005), a fruitful synthesis of much resent scholarship; Sufi and Scholar on the Desert Edge (1995).
- Benjamin Jokisch, Islamic Imperial Law. Harun-Al-Rashid's Codification Project (Berlin: Walter de Gruyter 2007) restates early Islamic legal history re law reform by Abbasid Caliphate (Baghdad, c.780-798), including reception of Roman law via Byzantine Empire, drafting a code, & centralized judiciary, followed by triumph of a vigorous opposition led by orthodox jurists & rise of legal theory; Islamisches Recht in Theorie und Praxis - Analyse einiger kaufrechtlicher Fatwas von Taqi'd-Din Ahmad b. Taymiyya (Berlin: K.Schwarz 1996).
- => The [t] following a title indicates books translated into English.

== Other and Incomplete: alphabetical ==
- Akbar [Jalaluddin Muhammad Akbar] (1542–1605), Mughul emperor; based chiefly on Islam and Hinduism he founded a court religion Din-i-Ilahi, which did not flourish following the end of his reign.
- Báb [Sayyid Ali Muhammad] (1819–1850), Iran; he proclaimed prophethood and, in succession to the three Abrahamic faiths including Islam, initiated a new religion which continues as the Baháʼí Faith.
- Juan Cole, American, contemporary academic and commentator on Islam.
- Mircea Eliade, Romania, U.S., late professor of comparative religions, University of Chicago.
- Cornell Fleischer, U.S., Kanuni Suleyman Prof. of Ottoman & Mod. Turkish Studies, Dept. of Nr. E. Lang. & Civil., U. of Chicago.
- H. A. R. Gibb (1895–1971), British historian of the Arabs and Islam.
- Betty Kelen, U.S., U.N. editor, author, Muhammad, The Messenger of God
- Martin Kramer (1954–>), Israel, modern partisan, Wash. Inst. for Near East Policy; Shalem Center; Harvard University.
- Richard Landes, U.S., Boston University, modern partisan.
- Franklin Lewis, U.S., Assoc. Prof. of Persian Lang. & Lit., Dept. of Near Eastern Lang. & Civil., U. of Chicago.
- Elijah Muhammad [Elijah Poole] (1897–1975), U.S., started the Nation of Islam movement and proclaimed prophethood.
- Pai Shou-i, China, Chung-kuo I-ssu-lan shih kang-yao [Essentials of the History of Chinese Islam] (19xy).
- Andrew Rippin, Britain, Canada, University of Victoria.
- A. Holly Shissler, U.S., prof. of Ottoman & Early Turkish Republican History, Dept. of Nr. E. Lang. & Civil., U. of Chicago.
- Srđa Trifković, Serbian-American journalist, political analyst, modern partisan; author, The Sword of the Prophet.
- John Woods, U.S., Prof. of Iranian & Central Asian History, Dept. of Near Eastern Lang. & Civil., Univ. of Chicago.
- Ehsan Yar-Shater (1920->) Editor of encyclopedia Danishnamah-i Iran va Islam (10 volumes, Teheran 1976–1982); editor of History of al-Tabari [re the Ta'rikh al-rusul wa'l-muluk] (39 volumes, SUNY c1985-c1999); editor of Encyclopædia Iranica (Costa Mesa: Mazda 1992->); History of Medicine in Iran (New York 2004).
- Irfan Shahid, (1926-2016>) Georgetown Univ., Dumbarton Oaks; Byzantium and the Arabs (1984–1995) multi-vol., pre-Islamic politics.
- Sami Zubaida (1937->) Univ.of London, Islam, the People and the State (1993); Law and Power in the Islamic World (I.B.Taurus 2003).
- Farhad Daftary (1938->) Inst. of Isma'ili Studies, London, The Isma'ilis: their history and doctrines (1990).
- Farhadt J. Ziadeh, University of Washington, Lawyers, the rule of law & liberalism in modern Egypt (1968).
- Mehrzad Boroujerdi U.S., Iranian Intellectuals and the West. The tormented triumph of nativism (Syracuse University 1996), includes clerical and lay religious thought, with critical profiles of several 20th-century academic writers.
- Malika Zeghal western academic, Institut d'Etudes Politiques (Paris), Gardiens de l'Islam. Les oulemas d'al-Azhar dans l'Egypte contemporaine (Paris 1996); Les islamistes morocains: le defi a la monarchie (Paris 2005); currently at Univ.of Chicago.
- Timur Kuran, Duke Univ., The Long Divergence. How Islamic law held back the Middle East (Princeton Univ. 2011); Islam and Mammon: The economic predicaments of Islamism (Princeton Univ. 2004).
- Alfonse Javed, N.Y. Sch.of the Bible, The Muslim Next Door (ANM 2013); Muslim Pakistani and Indian Students in their New York School System Experience (Liberty Univ. 2011).
- David S. Powers, Islamic Legal Interpretation. Muftis and their fatwas (1996); Dispensing Justice in Islam. Qadis and their judgments (2005).
- Claudia Liebeskind, Three Sufi traditions in South Asia in modern times (1998).
- Angelika Neuwirth, German Islamic studies scholar, Arabische Literatur. Postmodern (2004, t=2010); Scripture, Poetry and the Making of a Community (2015).
- Adam Gaiser, medieval Islamic studies, esp. Oman, Muslims, Scholars, Soldiers. The origin and elaboration of Ibadi Imanate traditions (2010).
- Rudolph Ware, The Walking Qur'an. Islamic education, embodied knowledge, and history in West Africa (2014).
- => The [t] following a title indicates books translated into English.

== See also ==
- Orientalism
- Middle Eastern studies
