= Abu Lu'lu'a =

Assassin of the 2nd caliph Umar

Abū Luʾluʾa Fīrūz
- أبو لؤلؤة فيروز
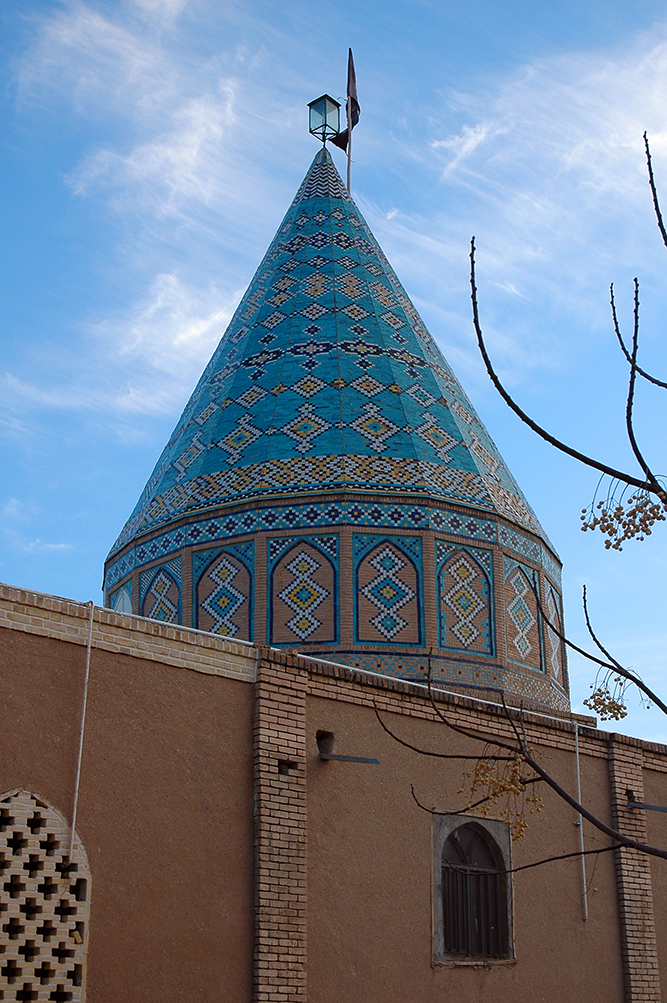
- Shrine of Abū Luʾluʾa in Kashan, Iran
- Born: Nahavand, Iran (likely)
- Died: Historical: 644; Medina, Arabia Legendary: after 644; Kashan, Iran
- Other names: Bābā Shujāʿ al-Dīn (16th century); Fīrūz Nahāvandī (20th century)
- Era: Early Islamic period
- Known for: Assassinating the caliph Umar

Abū Luʾluʾa Fīrūz (Arabic: أبو لؤلؤة فیروز, from Middle Persian: Pērōz), also known in modern Persian-language sources as Abū Luʾluʾ (ابولؤلؤ) or Fīrūz Nahāvandī (فیروز نهاوندی), was a Sasanian Persian slave who assassinated Umar ibn al-Khattab (r. 634–644), the second Islamic caliph, in November 644.

After having been captured in battle during the Arab-Muslim conquest of Persia, Abu Lu'lu'a was brought to Medina, the then-capital of the Rashidun Caliphate, which was normally off-limits to non-Arab captives. However, as a highly skilled craftsman, Abu Lu'lu'a was exceptionally allowed entrance into the city in order to work for the caliph. His motive for killing the caliph is not entirely clear, but medieval sources generally attribute it to a tax dispute. At one point, Abu Lu'lu'a is said to have asked the caliph to lift a tax imposed upon him by his Arab master, al-Mughira ibn Shu'ba. When Umar refused to lift the tax, Abu Lu'lu'a attacked him while he was leading the congregational prayer in the mosque, stabbing him with a double-bladed dagger and leaving him mortally wounded.

According to historical accounts, Abu Lu'lu'a was either captured and executed in Medina, or committed suicide there. In retaliation, Ubayd Allah ibn Umar (one of Umar's sons) killed Abu Lu'lu'a's daughter, as well as Hurmuzān (a former officer in the Sasanian army) and a Christian man from al-Hira (Iraq). However, according to later legends that were first recorded in the Safavid era, the prophet Muhammad's cousin and son-in-law Ali (later revered as the first Shi'ite Imam) saved Abu Lu'lu'a from his pursuers and miraculously transported him to the city of Kashan (Iran), where Abu Lu'lu'a married and lived out the rest of his life.

At some point a shrine was erected for Abu Lu'lu'a in Kashan. From the 16th century onward this shrine became the focus of a yearly anti-Sunni festival celebrating Abu Lu'lu'a's assassination of Umar, whose reign Shi'ites consider to have been oppressive and unjust. In the context of this festival, which is called Omar Koshan (lit. 'the killing of Umar'), Abu Lu'lu'a received the nickname Bābā Shujāʿ al-Dīn (بابا شجاع الدين, 'Father Courageous of the Faith').

== Name ==
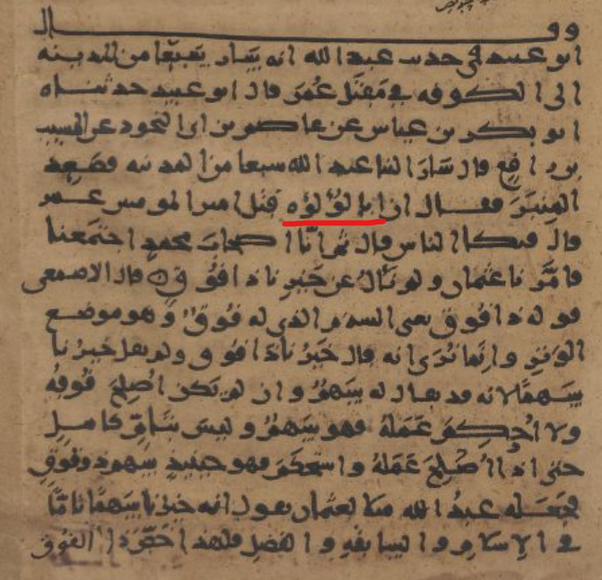
Abu Lu'lu'a's name highlighted in red, MS. Leiden Or. 298, dated 866 CE

Abu Lu'lu'a's given name was most likely Pērōz, a Middle Persian name meaning "Victorious" and Arabicized in the extant sources as Fīrūz or Fayrūz. However, in the early sources he is more commonly referred to by his Arabic kunya (either a teknonym or a nickname) Abū Luʾluʾa, meaning "Father of Pearl". From the 16th or 17th century onward he also received the Arabic laqab (honorific nickname) Bābā Shujāʿ al-Dīn (lit. 'Father Courageous of the Faith'), which was associated with the annual celebrations held in his honor in early modern Iran (see below). In modern Persian-language sources he is sometimes referred to by the non-historical name Fīrūz Nahāvandī (فیروز نهاوندی).

== Biography ==
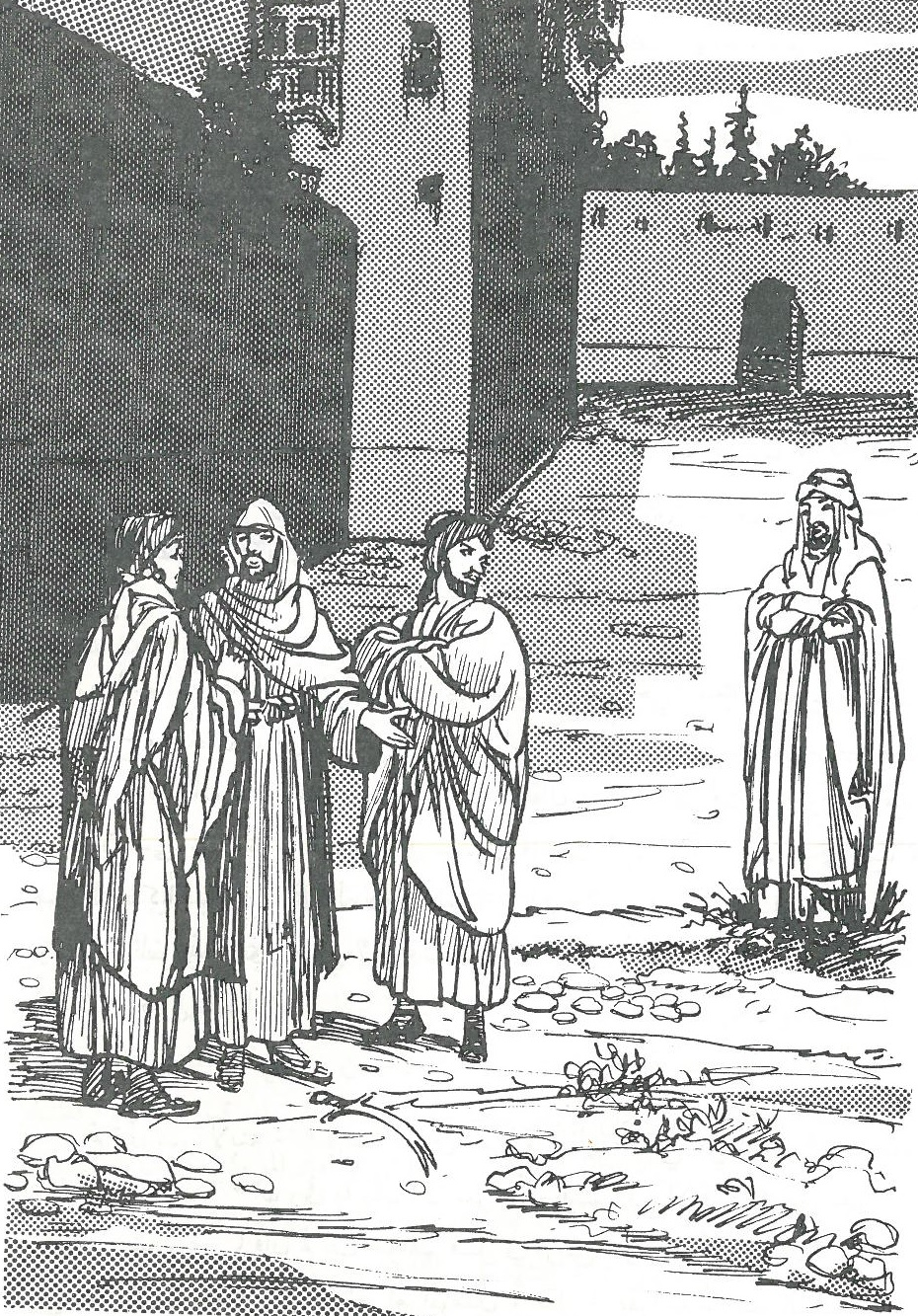
Early 20th-century depiction of Abd al-Rahman (ibn Awf or ibn Abi Bakr) witnessing the purported conspiracy of Abu Lu'lu'a, Hurmuzān, and Jufayna (wrongly depicted here as a woman; the depiction of the murder weapon may also be wrong)

Very little is known about his life. According to some historical accounts, Abu Lu'lu'a was a Zoroastrian from Nahavand (Iran), though other reports describe him as a Christian. A highly skilled joiner and blacksmith, Abu Lu'lu'a was probably taken captive by his Arab master al-Mughira ibn Shu'ba in the Battle of Nahavand (642) and subsequently brought to Arabia, where he may also have converted to Islam. Other historical sources report that he was rather taken captive by al-Mughira in the Battle of al-Qadisiyya (636), or that he was sold to al-Mughira by Hurmuzān, an ex-Sasanian military officer who had been working for Umar as an adviser after his own capture by the Muslims. Although Medina was generally off-limits to non-Arab captives under Umar's reign, Abu Lu'lu'a was exceptionally allowed to enter the capital of the early caliphate, being sent there by al-Mughira to serve the caliph.

When al-Mughira forced Abu Lu'lu'a to pay a kharāj tax of two dirhams a day, Abu Lu'lu'a turned to Umar to protest this tax. However, Umar refused to lift the tax, thus provoking Abu Lu'lu'a's rage. This is the reason given by most historical accounts for Abu Lu'lu'a's assassination of Umar, but Abu Lu'lu'a's true motivations are not clear. According to Wilferd Madelung in his The Succession to Muhammad, Umar's biased policies against non-Arabs may have played a prominent role in creating the climate which lead to the assassination.

One day when Umar was leading the congregational prayer in the mosque of Medina, Abu Lu'lu'a stabbed him with a double-bladed dagger. There are different versions of how this happened: according to one version, he also killed Kulayb ibn al-Bukayr al-Laythi who was behind Umar, while in another version he stabbed thirteen people who tried to restrain him. According to some accounts, the caliph died on the day of the stabbing (Wednesday 26 Dhu al-Hijja of the Islamic year 23, or 6 November 644 according to the Gregorian calendar), while other accounts maintain that he survived three more days.

Some historical sources report that Abu Lu'lu'a was taken prisoner and executed for his assassination of Umar, while other sources claim that he committed suicide. After Abu Lu'lu'a's death, his daughter was killed by Ubayd Allah ibn Umar, one of Umar's sons. Acting upon the claim of one man (either Abd al-Rahman ibn Awf or Abd al-Rahman ibn Abi Bakr) that they had been seen conspiring with Abu Lu'lu'a while he was holding the double-bladed dagger, Ubayd Allah also killed Hurmuzān (Umar's Persian military adviser), and Jufayna, a Christian man from al-Hira (Iraq) who had been taken to Medina to serve as a private tutor to a family in Medina. After Ubayd Allah was detained for these murders, he threatened to kill all foreign captives residing in Medina, as well as some others. Although Ubayd Allah may have been encouraged by his sister Hafsa bint Umar to avenge their father's death, his murder of Hurmuzān and Jufayna was likely the result of a mental breakdown rather than of a true conspiracy. It was regarded by his peers as a crime rather than as a legitimate act of retaliation.

In early 20th-century scholarship it was sometimes supposed that Abu Lu'lu'a had really been an instrument in the hands of a conspiracy, though not a conspiracy led by Hurmuzān, but rather one led by Ali, al-Zubayr ibn al-Awwam, and Talha ibn Ubayd Allah. These men, who according to the historical sources were appointed by Umar himself as members of the council who would elect the next caliph, were thought by scholars to have conspired to overthrow Umar's reign and to put Ali in his place. This hypothesis, however, is rejected by more recent scholars. Nevertheless, while Ubayd Allah was subsequently acquitted of his crimes by Umar's successor Uthman (r. 644–656), who considered the execution of Ubayd Allah an excessive measure in view of his father's recent assassination, Ali, among others, did protest against this and vowed to apply the regular punishment for murder if he were ever to be caliph.

Madelung in his The Succession to Muhammad has pointed out that just like Abu Lu'lu'a's assassination of Umar over something as trivial as a tax burden, Ubayd Allah's retaliatory killing of apparently random non-Arabs bears witness to the strong tensions that existed between Arabs and non-Arabs in the early Islamic caliphate. According to Tayeb El-Hibri, the 9th-century historians who recorded these events (amongst others, Ibn Sa'd, al-Baladhuri, al-Tabari) regarded them as laying the first seeds of the special affinity between Persia and the Hashimid family of the prophet (including Ali), which would later be reflected in the crucial role played by Khurasani converts in overthrowing the Umayyads and establishing the Hashimid rule of the Abbasids during the Abbasid Revolution (750 CE).

== Legacy ==
=== Sanctuary in Kashan ===
According to later legends, Abu Lu'lu'a did not die in Medina, but was miraculously saved from his pursuers by Ali, who transported him by means of a special prayer to Kashan (a city in central Iran), where he married and lived out the rest of his life. This story was recorded by the anti-Shi'ite polemicist Mirza Makhdum Sharifi (1540/41–1587), but Abu Lu'lu'a's connections to Kashan seem to go back further, since already in the Mujmal al-tawārīkh wa-l-qiṣaṣ (an anonymous work written c. 1126) it is mentioned that Abu Lu'lu'a came from Fin, a village near Kashan. At some point a shrine was dedicated to Abu Lu'lu'a in the vicinity of Kashan, which was said to be built over his tomb. The first records of Abu Lu'lu'a's tomb in Kashan appear in the works of Ghiyath al-Din Khwandamir (c. 1475 – c. 1535) and Nur Allah al-Shushtari (1549–1610).

Recently, there has been some controversy over this sanctuary, with a number of Sunni institutions, such as the al-Azhar University and the International Union for Muslim Scholars, demanding the Iranian government demolish the shrine. The shrine was reportedly shut down in 2007 by Ayatollah Mohammad-Ali Taskhiri, who was known as a strong proponent of Sunni-Shi'i reconciliation.

=== Annual celebration ===
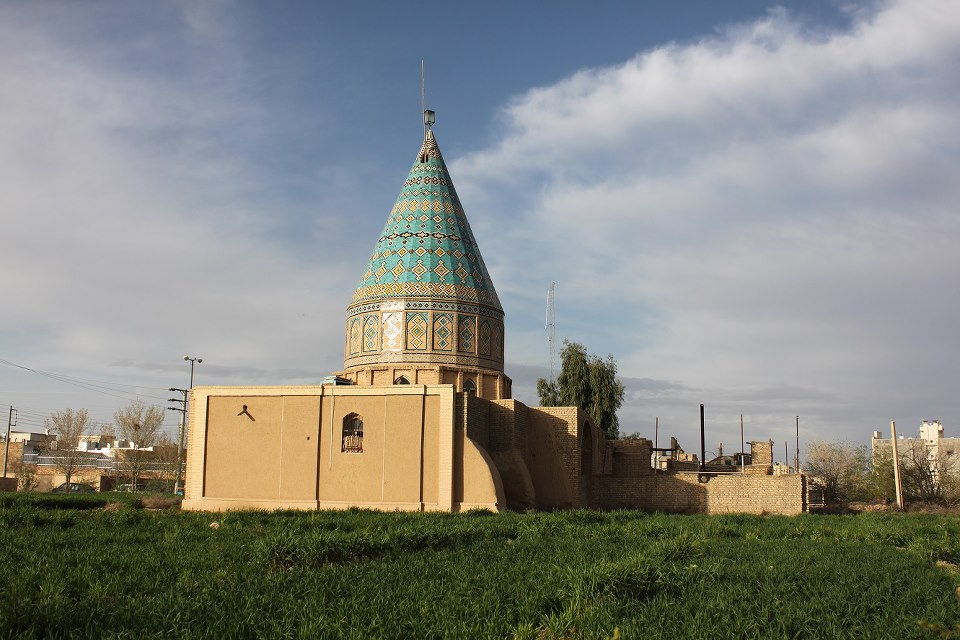
Shrine of Abu Lu'lu'a in Kashan, Iran

During the 16th-century conversion of Iran to Shia Islam under Safavid rule, a festival began being held in honor of Abu Lu'lu'a and his assassination of Umar. Named Omar-koshan (lit. 'the killing of Umar'), it was originally held around Abu Lu'lu'a's sanctuary in Kashan, on the anniversary of Umar's assassination (26 Dhu al-Hijja). Later the celebration spread elsewhere in Iran, and was sometimes held on 9 Rabi' al-Awwal rather than on 26 Dhu al-Hijja.

The festival celebrated Abu Lu'lu'a, nicknamed Bābā Shujāʿ al-Dīn (lit. 'Father Courageous of the Faith'), as a national hero who had defended the religion by killing the oppressive caliph. Umar was not only seen as a persecutor of non-Arabs, he was also thought to have threatened and injured Muhammad's daughter and Ali's wife Fatima. Because of this, Umar came to be regarded by Shi'is (who revere Fatima) as a symbol of the oppression of their sect. The establishment of the festival was related to the more general institution in early Safavid Iran of the ritual cursing of the first three Rashidun caliphs (revered by Sunnis but regarded by Shi'is as usurpers of Ali's rightful position as caliph). It involved the beating and burning of effigies of Umar, accompanied by cursing and the recitation of vilifying poetry.

During the Qajar period (1789–1925), the ritual cursing and humiliation of the first three caliphs was gradually abandoned due to the improving political relations with the Sunni Ottomans. Thus, by the beginning of the 20th century, the festival of Omar Koshan had fallen into disuse in the major cities of Iran, surviving only in the countryside. This evolution was further spurred on by the rise of pan-islamism (an ideology advocating the unity of all Muslims, both Shi'is and Sunnis) in the late 19th century. It reached a peak with the Islamic Revolution in 1979, which lead to the ritual being officially banned in the Islamic Republic of Iran.

Nevertheless, the festival is still celebrated in Iran, though often secretly and indoors. It is now held on the 9th day of the month of Rabi' Al-Awwal of the Islamic year, lasting until the 27th. It is a carnival-type of festival in which social roles are reversed and communal norms upturned, generally functioning as a more lighthearted counterpart to the ta'ziyeh passion plays commemorating the death of the prophet Muhammad's grandson Husayn ibn Ali at the Battle of Karbala in 680. Nowadays, the Umar who is scorned at the festival is sometimes taken to be Umar ibn Sa'ad, the leader of the troops who killed Husayn at Karbala, an identification which further removes the festival from its anti-Sunni origins.
