= W. Montgomery Watt =

Scottish historian and orientalist (1909–2006)

The Reverend W. Montgomery Watt
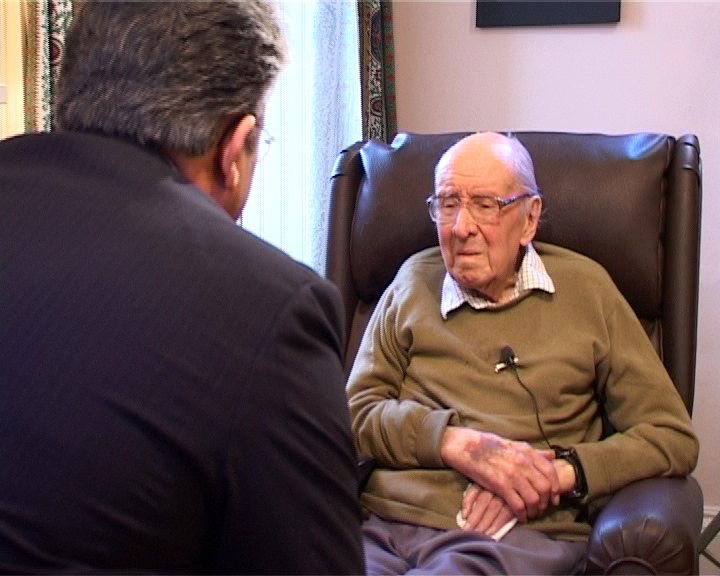
- Watt (right), being interviewed by Ali Akbar Abdolrashidi.
- Born: William Montgomery Watt; 14 March 1909; Ceres, Fife, Scotland
- Died: 24 October 2006 (aged 97); Edinburgh, Scotland
- Title: Professor of Arabic and Islamic Studies

Academic work
- Discipline: Oriental studies and Religious studies
- Sub-discipline: Arabic; History of Islam; Muhammad; Islamic Philosophy; Islamic theology
- Institutions: Anglican Diocese of Jerusalem; University of Edinburgh
- Notable works: Muhammad at Mecca (1953); Muhammad at Medina (1956)

William Montgomery Watt (14 March 1909 – 24 October 2006) was a Scottish historian and orientalist. An Anglican priest, Watt served as Professor of Arabic and Islamic Studies at the University of Edinburgh from 1964 to 1979 and was also a prominent contributor to the field of Quranic studies.

Watt was one of the foremost non-Muslim interpreters of Islam in the West. Watt's comprehensive biography of the Islamic prophet Muhammad, Muhammad at Mecca (1953) and Muhammad at Medina (1956), are considered to be classics in the field.

== Early life and education ==
Watt was born on 14 March 1909 in Ceres, Fife, Scotland. His father, who died when he was only 14 months old, was a minister of the Church of Scotland. He attended George Watson's College, Edinburgh; he then completed studies in classics the University of Edinburgh, and the Greats and BLitt at Oxford.

== Career ==
=== Ordained ministry ===
Watt was ordained in the Scottish Episcopal Church as a deacon in 1939 and as a priest in 1940. He served his curacy at St Mary The Boltons, West Brompton, in the Diocese of London from 1939 to 1941. When St Mary's was damaged in The Blitz, he moved to Old Saint Paul's, Edinburgh to continue his training. From 1943 to 1946, he served as an Arabic specialist to the Anglican Bishop of Jerusalem.

After Watt returned to academia in 1946, he never again held a full-time religious appointment. He did, however, continue his ministry with part-time and honorary positions. From 1946 to 1960, he was an honorary curate at Old Saint Paul's, Edinburgh, an Anglo-Catholic church in Edinburgh. He became a member of the ecumenical Iona Community in Scotland in 1960. From 1960 to 1967, he was an honorary curate at St Columba's-by-the-Castle, near Edinburgh Castle. Between 1980 and 1993, following his retirement from academia, he was an honorary curate at St Mary the Virgin, Dalkeith and at St Leonard's Church, Lasswade.

=== Academic career ===
Watt was Professor of Arabian and Islamic Studies at the University of Edinburgh from 1964 to 1979.

He has been called "The Last Orientalist".

Watt held visiting professorships at the University of Toronto, the Collège de France and Georgetown University.

== Later life ==
Watt died in Edinburgh on 24 October 2006 at the age of 97. He had four daughters and a son with his wife Jean. The family went on holidays in Crail, a Scottish village. On his death, the writer Richard Holloway wrote of Watt that "he spent his life battling against the tide of intolerance".

== Honours ==
Watt received the American Giorgio Levi Della Vida Medal and won, as its first recipient, the British Society for Middle Eastern Studies award for outstanding scholarship.

Watt received an honorary doctorate from Aberdeen University.

== Assessment and legacy ==
Watt's works are considered a classic in modern Western Islamic studies. Watt believed that the Qur'an was divinely inspired but not infallibly true.

Martin Forward, a 21st-century non-Muslim Islamic scholar, states:

His books have done much to emphasize the Prophet's commitment to social justice; Watt has described him as being like an Old Testament prophet, who came to restore fair dealing and belief in one God to the Arabs, for whom these were or had become irrelevant concepts. This would not be a sufficiently high estimate of his worth for most Muslims, but it's a start. Frankly, it's hard for Christians to say affirmative things about a religion like Islam that postdates their own, which they are brought up to believe contains all things necessary for salvation. And it's difficult for Muslims to face the fact that Christians aren't persuaded by the view that Christianity is only a stop on the way to Islam, the final religion."

Carole Hillenbrand, a professor of Islamic History at the University of Edinburgh, states:

He was not afraid to express rather radical theological opinions – controversial ones in some Christian ecclesiastical circles. He often pondered on the question of what influence his study of Islam had exerted on him in his own Christian faith. As a direct result, he came to argue that the Islamic emphasis on the uncompromising oneness of God had caused him to reconsider the Christian doctrine of the Trinity, which is vigorously attacked in the Holy Qur'an as undermining true monotheism.
Influenced by Islam, with its 99 names of God, each expressing special attributes of God, Watt returned to the Latin word "persona" – which meant a "face" or "mask", and not "individual", as it now means in English – and he formulated the view that a true interpretation of Trinity would not signify that God comprises three individuals. For him, Trinity represents three different "faces" of the one and the same God.

According to Carole Hillenbrand "an enormously influential scholar in the field of Islamic studies and a much-revered name for many Muslims all over the world". His account of the origin of Islam met with criticism from other scholars such as John Wansbrough of the University of London's School of Oriental and African Studies, and Patricia Crone and Michael Cook, in their book Hagarism: The Making of the Islamic World (1977), and Crone's Meccan Trade and the Rise of Islam. However, Both Patricia Crone and Michael Cook have since said that the central thesis of the book "Hagarism" was mistaken because the evidence they had to support the thesis was not sufficient or internally consistent enough.

Pakistani academic, Zafar Ali Qureshi, in his book, Prophet Muhammad and His Western Critics: A Critique of W. Montgomery Watt and Others has criticized Watt as having incorrectly portrayed the life of Muhammad in his works. Qureshi's book was praised by Turkish academic İbrahim Kalın.

French jurist Georges-Henri Bousquet has mocked Watt's book, Muhammad at Mecca, describing it as "A Marxist interpretation of the origins of Islam by an Episcopal clergyman." Danish historian Patricia Crone took issue with Watt's approach of extracting "historical" information from mythical stories by simply excluding the miraculous elements.

== Selected works ==
- The faith and practice of al-Ghazālī (1953) ISBN 978-0-686-18610-6
- Muhammad at Mecca (1953) ISBN 978-0-19-577278-4 (online)
- Muhammad at Medina (1956) ISBN 978-0-19-577307-1 (online)
- Muhammad: Prophet and Statesman (1961) ISBN 978-0-19-881078-0, a summary of the above two major works (online)
- Islamic Philosophy and Theology (1962) ISBN 978-0-202-36272-4
- Companion to the Qur'an - Based On the Arberry Translation (1967)
- Islamic Political Thought (1968) ISBN 978-0-85224-403-6
- Islamic Surveys: The Influence of Islam on Medieval Europe (1972) ISBN 978-0-85224-439-5
- The Majesty That Was Islam (1976) ISBN 978-0-275-51870-7
- What Is Islam? (1980) ISBN 978-0-582-78302-7
- Muhammad's Mecca (1988) ISBN 978-0-85224-565-1
- Muslim-Christian Encounters: Perceptions and Misperceptions (1991) ISBN 978-0-415-05411-9
- Early Islam (1991) ISBN 978-0-7486-0170-7
- Islamic Philosophy And Theology (1987) ISBN 978-0-7486-0749-5
- Islamic Creeds (1994) ISBN 978-0-7486-0513-2
- History of Islamic Spain (1996) ISBN 978-0-85224-332-9
- Islamic Political Thought (1998) ISBN 978-0-7486-1098-3
- Islam and the Integration of Society (1998) ISBN 978-0-8101-0240-8
- Islam: A Short History (1999) ISBN 978-1-85168-205-8
- A Christian Faith For Today (2002) ISBN 0-415-27703-5
