= The Succession to Muhammad =

Book by Wilferd Madelung

The Succession to Muhammad: A Study of the Early Caliphate
- Author: Wilferd Madelung
- Language: English
- Subject: Succession to Muhammad, Rashidun Caliphate
- Genre: Non-fiction
- Publisher: Cambridge University Press
- Publication date: 1997
- Publication place: United States
- Media type: Print, e-book
- Pages: xviii + 413
- ISBN: 0-521-56181-7

The Succession to Muhammad is a book by Wilferd Madelung published by the Cambridge University Press in 1997. Madelung investigates the events after the death of Muhammad, where there was a battle to see who would control the Muslim community. This struggle resulted in the difference between Sunnite and Shi'ite Islam over authority (spiritual and temporal).

== Content ==
The Introduction argues that hereditary succession was common at that time, especially among Muhammad's tribe of Quraysh. The Qur'an too, Madelung argues, stresses importance of kinship ties, and earlier prophets had wished to be succeeded by their descendants or relatives. It is followed by four chapters, one on each of the first four caliphs. In the first chapter, Madelung posits that Abu Bakr had planned before Muhammad's death to acquire for himself the position of caliph. Although a general election would have resulted in a dynastic succession in the person of Muhammad's cousin Ali, the assembly of the Ansar at Saqifa afforded Abu Bakr his chance to realize his plans, who then proceeded to maneuver the assembly to ensure his own election. He consolidated his caliphate by empowering the Quraysh, sidelining the Ansar, who supported Ali, and marginalizing Muhammad's clan Banu Hashim.

The second chapter discusses Umar's appointment by Abu Bakr when the latter died. Umar is asserted to be unpopular among the companions of Muhammad as well as Quraysh, but the latter supported his selection for he protected their interests and because a general election would have resulted in coming to power of Muhammad's family. Uthman, the subject of the third chapter, is shown as weak military commander as well as nepotistic. The revolution that ended in his death is discussed.

Ali, the subject of the fourth and longest chapter, is shown as champion of Islamic principles. He reversed Uthman's nepotistic policies, refused to make compromises on principles and was beset by opposition. Ali's acceptance of arbitration at the Battle of Siffin is characterized as a flaw in his leadership which demoralized his supporters and gave moral victory to his opponent, Mu'awiya. The latter is roundly criticized in Conclusion, which discusses events after Ali's death, as a despot and a coward, who turned the caliphate into a tool of imperial repression.

== Reception ==
Andrew J. Newman praised the work, stating it had "laid down a marker", and the critics would need to raise their standard of scholarship. James E. Lindsay considered the book a "compelling re-assessment of the Rashidun" period and a "welcome addition" to historiography of early Islam which those interested in Islamic history should read. The reader is sometimes "taken aback" by the attacks on various characters. Elton L. Daniel called the book "erudite, complex, and fascinating", praising it for "counter-balancing popular views about origins and development of Shi'ism". In his view, Madelung "has an axe to grind" against earlier scholars writing on the subject, and criticized Madelung's approach to sources where accounts supporting his case are accepted as coming from "best" and "most reliable" sources whereas contradicting ones are dismissed as "baseless" and "unreliable". According to William A. Graham, the book gives a "readable account of the earliest history" of the Islamic community, but the author's approach to sift through anecdotal and contradictory accounts while extrapolating motives of actors based on intuition in search of "poetical truth" is surprising.

In the view of Keith Lewinstein, the work will be a useful reference for Muslim traditions on the events after Muhammad's death. He criticized Madelung's uncritical attitude towards early Arabic sources which he uses to recover "precise words, thoughts, and even emotions of the principal actors." The approach to admitting and dismissing evidence is arbitrary, elements colored by later disputes are taken at face value, and traditions identified by the author to contain partisan or legendary elements are nevertheless admitted without justification if it suits the argument. According to Michael G. Morony, the work is possibly the "fullest account" of the first four caliphs in English and it is a "judicious and honestly critical" account of the events. But this does not save him from "self-serving, tendentious arguments." He criticized Madelung's argument that hereditary succession was norm in the day for it was usually military action which decided succession, with the exception of the Sasanians. Traditions supporting the author's arguments are highlighted while those opposing it are ignored. Madelung seems to be concerned more with "what should have happened" rather than what did happen.

In the view of Hugh N. Kennedy, the work is a "masterpiece of traditional orientalist scholarship", which those interested in the history of the period should consult. However, those wishing to understand the historical development of the Muslim community should approach it with caution. Madelung's attitude to sources is shared by few historians, as he uses them with utmost trust, taking utterances ascribed to various characters as if they were "minutes of a council meeting". He then uses these to analyze their motivations without seriously considering that most of these reflect later interpolations. On the other hand, modern scholarship, save Caetani and some other early historians, is ignored. Given that most modern scholarship has been pro-Sunnite, it is "interesting and stimulating" to see a "pro-Alid reading of the sources". Nevertheless, he is "vigorously, and at times disconcertingly, partisan". Ingrid Mattson finds Madelung "thorough" in his treatment of the subject but "not very scholarly" as he is selective in his source use, accepting traditions that support his argument and rejecting those that do not. Madelung's argument of basing Ali's claim to rule on the Qur'an is credible but is based on misreading of the term ahl al-bayt. The book can serve as an excellent reference on the history of Ali's caliphate "if one can see beyond his narrow interpretation of the sources".

According to Yasin Dutton, the author has a "deep familiarity" with the sources and has been able to "critique successfully" earlier historians Like Caetani, Wellhausen, and Vaglieri. Madelung's conclusions he labels as being "too extreme to be convincing", holding that earlier, less tendentious sources, such as Muwatta of Malik, give a better image of the Umayyads who "come off worst" in Madelung's account. In the assessment of Patricia Crone, "a towering authority on Islamic sects" has produced a book that "does not seem to be about history in the modern sense at all". He takes a conservative approach to the sources, where speeches and dialogues "are generally taken to represent what people actually said", and "the tone is openly partisan". Madelung's assessment that the egalitarianism and tribal autonomy of the early period were replaced by an imperial government is correct, but he associates the change with "the personalities, ambitions, and intrigues of the individuals", blaming especially Mu'awiya and the Umayyads for the transformation, while in reality it was an inevitable consequence of broader processes of conquests, Arab migration out of Arabia and state building.

== Sources ==
- Crone, Patricia (1997). "In Defence of Ali: Wilferd Madelung, The Succession to Muhammad: A Study of the Early Caliphate (review)". Times Literary Supplement. No. February 1997. p. 28.
- Daniel, Elton (1998). "The Succession to Muhammad: A Study of the Early Caliphate, by Wilferd Madelung (review)". Middle East Journal. 52 (3): 471–472. JSTOR 4329241.
- Dutton, Yasin (1998). "The Succession to Muhammad: A Study of the Early Caliphate By Wilferd Madelung (review)". Journal of Islamic Studies. 9 (1): 66–69. JSTOR 26198317.
- Graham, William (1999). "The Succession to Muhammad: A Study of the Early Caliphate. By Wilferd Madelung (review)". The Muslim World. 89 (2): 194.
- Hughes, Aaron (2013). Muslim Identities: An Introduction to Islam. New York: Columbia University Press. ISBN 9780231531924.
- Kennedy, Hugh (1998). "The Succession to Muhammad: A Study of the Early Caliphate. By Wilferd Madelung (review)". Journal of the Royal Asiatic Society. 8 (1): 88–89. doi:10.1017/s1356186300016473. JSTOR 25183470.
- Lewinstein, Keith (2001). "The Succession to Muhammad: A Study of the Early Caliphate. By Wilferd Madelung (review)". The Journal of the American Oriental Society. 121 (2): 326–327. doi:10.2307/606600. JSTOR 606600.
- Lindsay, James (1997). "The Succession to Muhammad: A Study of the Early Caliphate, by Wilferd Madelung (review)". Middle East Studies Association Bulletin. 31 (2): 166–167. JSTOR 23061434.
- Mattson, Ingrid (1998). "Madelung, Wilferd. The Succession to Muhammad: A Study of the Early Caliphate (review)". The Journal of Religion. 78 (2): 321–322. doi:10.1086/490222. JSTOR 1205984.
- Morony, Michael (2000). "The Succession to Muhammad: A Study of the Early Caliphate. By Wilferd Madelung (review)". Journal of Near Eastern Studies. 59 (2): 153–156. JSTOR 545637.
- Newman, Andrew (1999). "The Succession to Muhammad: A Study of the Early Caliphate, Wilferd Madelung (review)". Iranian Studies. 32 (3): 403–405. doi:10.1080/00210869908701963. JSTOR 4311271.
