= Shrine of Abu Lu'lu'a =

Closed mausoleum in Kashan, Iran

- بقعه ابولولو
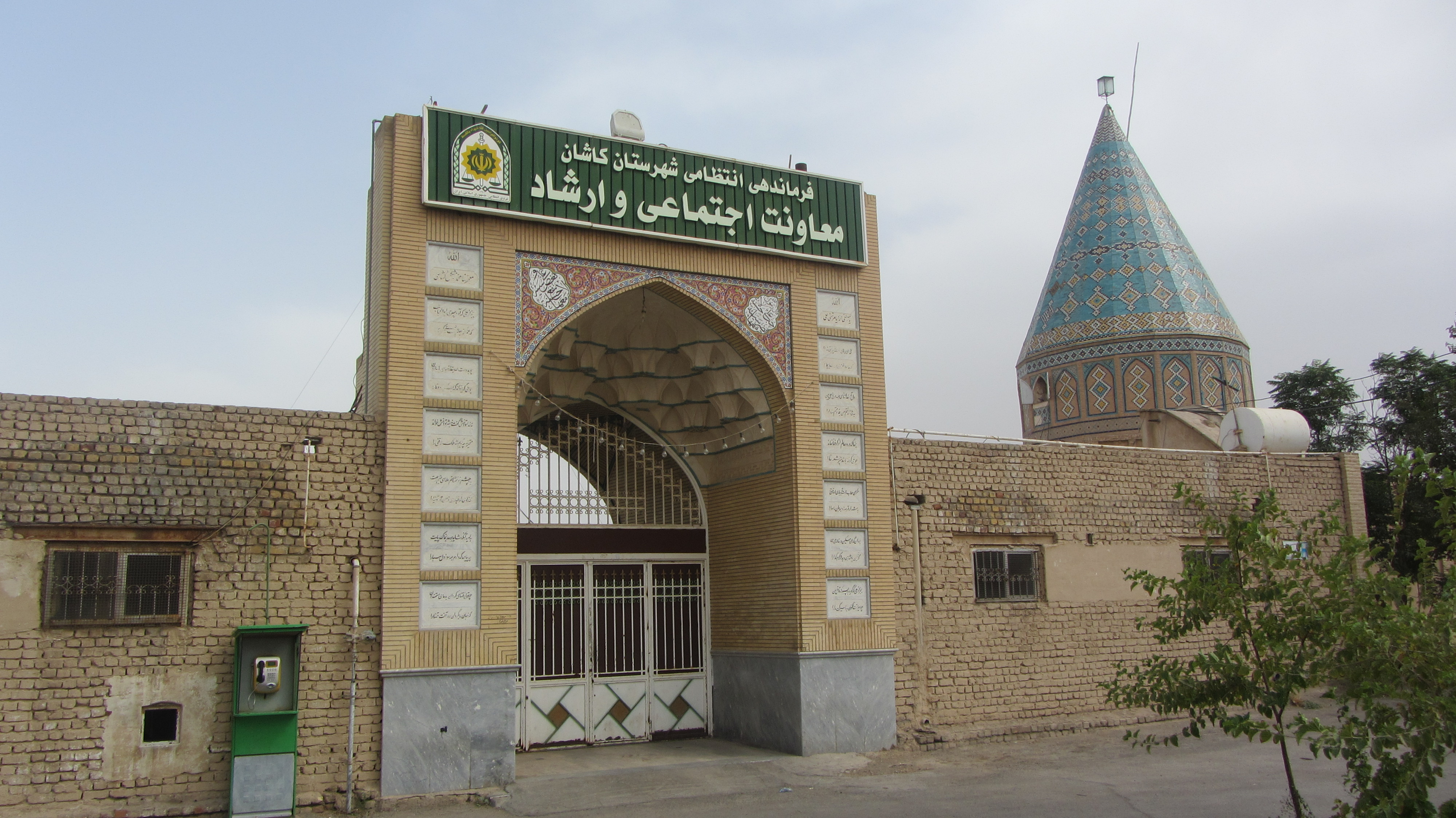
- The closed mausoleum, in 2017, with iwan and conical dome

- Location of the closed shrine in Iran

Religion
- Affiliation: Shia Islam (closed)
- Festival: Omar Koshan
- Ecclesiastical or organizational status: Mausoleum and shrine (closed since 2007)
- Status: Closed (since 2007)

Location
- Location: Kashan, Isfahan province
- Country: Iran
- Interactive map of Shrine of Abu Lu'lu'a
- Coordinates: 33°58′11″N 51°25′00″E

Architecture
- Type: Islamic architecture
- Style: Mongol/Ilkhanid; Safavid; Qajar
- Completed: 777 AH (1375/1376 CE); 19th century (renovations)

Specifications
- Interior area: 200 m^{2} (2,200 sq ft)
- Dome: One: conical
- Dome height (outer): 19 m (62 ft)
- Site area: 1,000 m^{2} (0.25 acres)
- Shrines: One: Abu Lu'lu'a Firuz (d. 644)
- Materials: Adobe; bricks; mortar; tiles
- Elevation: 956 m (3,136 ft)
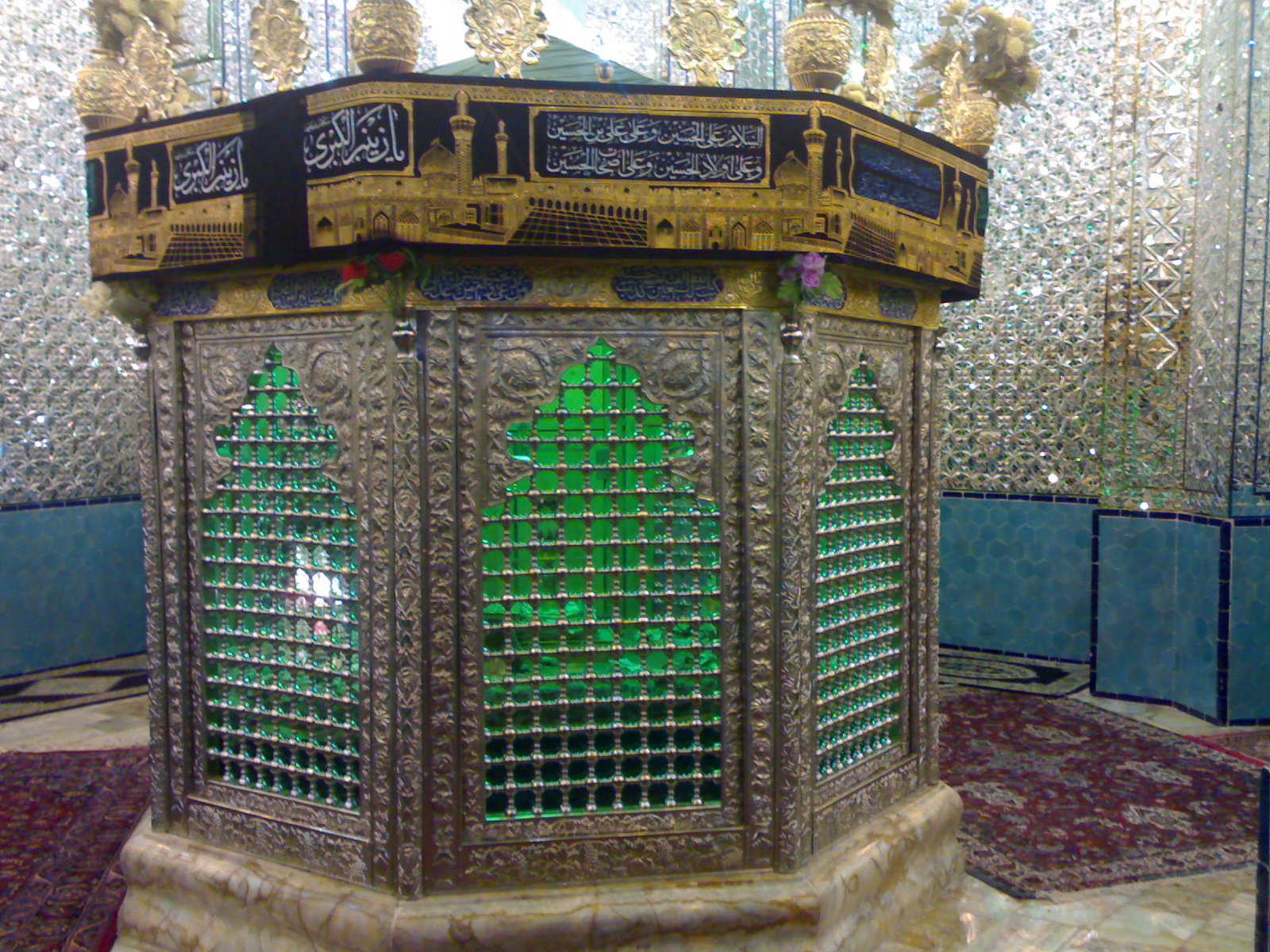
- Purportedly the tomb of Abu Lu'lu'a inside the shrine complex

Iran National Heritage List
- Official name: Mausoleum of Abu Lulua
- Type: Built
- Designated: 6 September 1975
- Reference no.: 1091
- Conservation organization: Cultural Heritage, Handicrafts and Tourism Organization of Iran

The Shrine of Abu Lu'lu'a (Persian: بقعه ابولولو), also known as the Shrine of Bābā Shujāʿ al-Dīn (بقعه بابا شجاع الدين) is a closed mausoleum and shrine located in Kashan, in the province of Isfahan, Iran. The shrine was built over what is popularly believed to be the final resting place of Abu Lu'lu'a Firuz, a Persian slave who assassinated the second Islamic caliph Umar ibn al-Khattab in 644 CE.

The structure dates from the Mongol era (13th–15th century), and during the 16th century it became the central location of a yearly festival celebrating Abu Lu'lu'a, called Omar Koshan ("the Killing of Umar").

The mausoleum was added to the Iran National Heritage List on 6 September 1975 and is administered by the Cultural Heritage, Handicrafts and Tourism Organization of Iran. Due to pressure from the International Union of Muslim Scholars, the Iranian government closed the complex in 2007.

== Architecture ==
The original structure was built before the Safavid era (1501–1736), at some time during the Mongol era (13th–15th century). However, the building's dome and iwan date from the Safavid era or later.

== Festival ==
The historical Abu Lu'lu'a died in Medina (the capital of the early caliphate, situated in the Arabian Peninsula) shortly after his assassination of Umar ibn al-Khattab in 644 CE. At some later time, legends arose according to which Abu Lu'lu'a was saved from his pursuers by Ali ibn Abi Talib (the cousin and son-in-law of the prophet Muhammad, who is also revered by Shi'ite Muslims as the first Imam). According to these stories, Ali instantaneously transported Abu Lu'lu'a by means of a special prayer to Kashan, where he married and lived out the rest of his life.

During the 16th-century Safavid conversion of Iran to Shia Islam, a festival started to be celebrated in honor of Abu Lu'lu'a, commemorating his assassination of Umar. Named Omar Koshan (lit. 'the killing of Umar'), it was originally held around Abu Lu'lu'a's sanctuary in Kashan, each year at the anniversary of Umar's death (26 Dhu'l-Hijja of the Islamic year). Later it also started to be celebrated elsewhere in Iran, sometimes on 9 Rabi' al-Awwal rather than on 26 Dhu'l-Hijja. The festival celebrated Abu Lu'lu'a, nicknamed for the occasion Bābā Shujāʿ al-Dīn (lit. 'Father Courageous of the Faith'), as a national hero who had defended the religion by killing the oppressive caliph.

Due to political sensitivities, from the Qajar era (1789–1925) onward the festival gradually stopped being celebrated in the major cities of Iran, until it was eventually officially banned by the Islamic Republic of Iran in 1979. Nevertheless, the festival itself is still celebrated in Iran, though often secretly and indoors rather than outdoors. It is now held on the 9th day of the month of Rabi' Al-Awwal of the Islamic year, lasting until the 27th of the same month.

== Controversy ==
In the mid-2000s, controversy was caused when al-Azhar University demanded the Iranian government demolish Abu Lu'lu'a's shrine, because the shrine was considered to be "offensive and un-Islamic" by mainstream Sunni scholars. The issue caused the cancellation of diplomatic relations between the university and the Iranian government. The Iranian government closed the shrine in 2007 as a result of Sunni pressure, including an intervention by the International Union for Muslim Scholars.

== Gallery ==
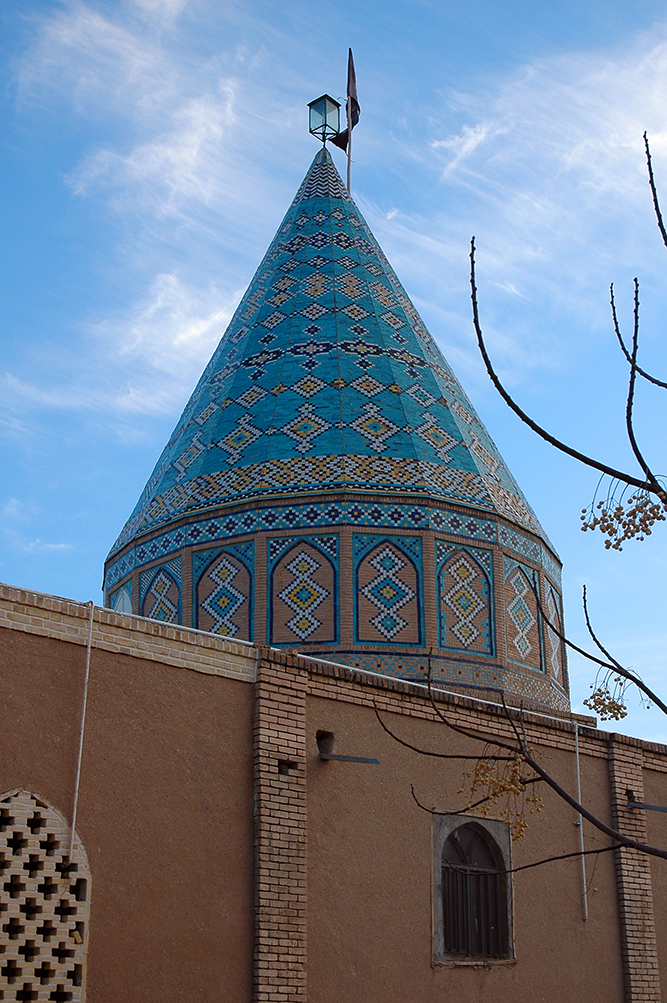
View of the conical dome

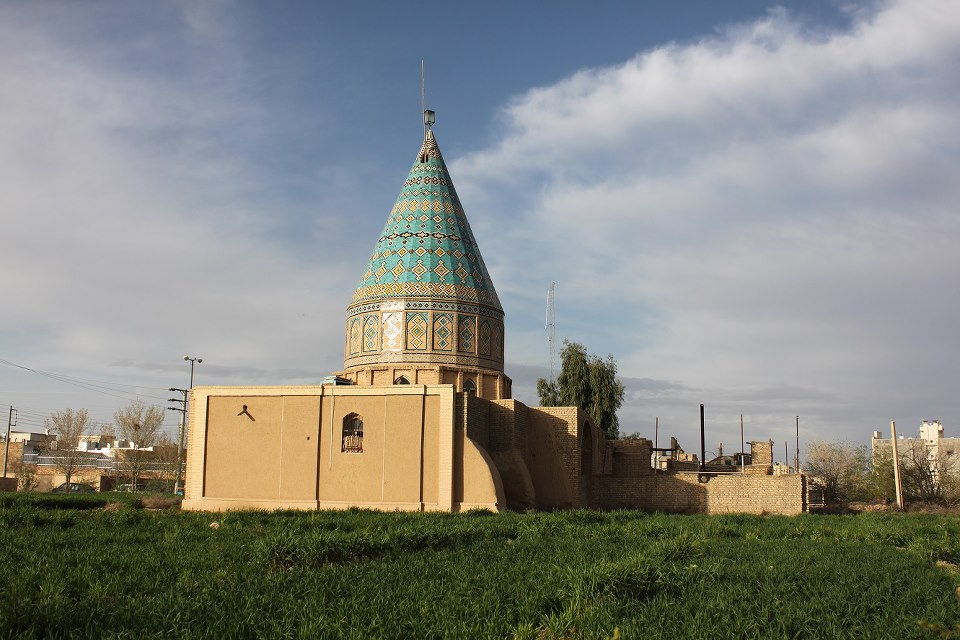
The shrine in 2015

== See also ==
- List of historical structures in Isfahan Province
- List of mausoleums in Iran
- Shia Islam in Iran
