= Martin Hinds =

British Middle East scholar and historiographer of early Islamic history (1941-1988)

Martin Hinds (10 April 1941 – 1 December 1988) was a British scholar of the Middle East and historiographer of early Islamic history who was born in Penarth, Wales.

== Life ==
Dr. Hind's interest in Islamic culture began as early as the year 1960 when he was a student of Arabic at the School of Oriental and African Studies SOAS where he developed a number of close friendships with scholars from North Africa. In the summer of 1962, he arrived in Tunisia and visited famous historic places there like the prominent Carthage, a suburb of Tunis that was the centre of the Carthaginian Empire in antiquity. He visited also famous Islamic monuments like Al-Zaytuna Mosque. Built early in the 8th century AD, it is the oldest mosque in the capital of Tunisia and the second to be built in Ifriqiya and the Maghreb region after the Mosque of Uqba in Al-Kairouan. Dr. Hinds also visited Al-Kairouan and its Mosque of Uqba. He was fascinated by Islamic architecture and by the academic role of the Al-Zaytuna mosque which is known to have hosted one of the first and greatest universities in the history of Islam. He also travelled by ordinary citizen mini-bus through Libya to Egypt in 1962 and 1965, and was a welcome visitor for an old English friend en route.

== Research ==
Together with Patricia Crone he argues in his book God's Caliph : Religious Authority in the First Centuries of Islam that the first Caliphs were heads of state as well as heads of the religious community. Later religious scholars claimed power for themselves on behalf of the communities they represented, thus creating the situation in Sunni Islam where there is no centralized religious power. The Shi'ite system is therefore no deviation but represents the original order of power in early Islam. Martin Hinds adhered to the Revisionist School of Islamic Studies.

== Works ==
- God's Caliph : Religious Authority in the First Centuries of Islam (1986), with Patricia Crone.
- The History of al-Tabari Vol. 23: The Zenith of the Marwanid House (1990), as translator.

== Papers related to Ibadism ==
- Hinds, Martin: (1991) An early islamic family from Oman: al-ʿAwtabī's account of the Muhallabids. Manchester: University of Manchester, 1991. Journal of Semitic Studies. Monographs, 17. [ed. and transl. by Martin Hinds], (3, 97 pp., 25 cm.). ISBN 0-9516124-0-9 (pbk).
- Hinds, Martin: (1996) Studies in early Islamic history. Ed. by Jere Bacharag, Lawrence I. Conrad and Patricia Crone. With an introduction by G.R. Hawting. Princeton, New Jersey: Darwin Press, 1996, (xix, 262 pp.; ill.; 25 cm.). ISBN 0-87850-109-6.
- Hinds, Martin: (2010) The Ṣiffīn arbitration agreement. In: Saeed, Abdullah: (ed.) Islamic political thought and governance. London: Routledge, 2010, vol. 1.
