= Muhammad at Medina =

1956 book by William Montgomery Watt

- Title page for Muhammad at Medina (1962)
- Author: W. Montgomery Watt
- Language: English
- Genre: Non-fiction
- Publisher: Oxford University Press
- Publication date: 1956
- Pages: 418
- ISBN: 0-19-577307-1
- Preceded by: Muhammad at Mecca

Muhammad at Medina is a book about early Islam written by the non-Muslim Islamic scholar W. Montgomery Watt. Published at 418 pages by Oxford University Press in 1956, it is the sequel to Watt's 1953 volume, Muhammad at Mecca.

Together these two scholarly books form "a history of the life of Muhammad and the origins of the Islamic community," specifically his life in Medina. Watt also states in the 1955 "Preface" that his fourth and fifth chapters here ("The Unifying of the Arabs" and "The Internal Politics of Medina") are a pioneering effort, and therefore required greater length than otherwise warranted. The work is the fruit of his examination of the early Arabic sources, and a vast mass of scholarly discussion. To these Watt brought a new perspective, and attempted to answer many questions that had hardly been raised before.

Several years later, Oxford University published another, third book by Watt about the life of Muhammad, an abridgement which was intended for a more general readership, Muhammad Prophet and Statesman (1961).

== Contents ==
- I. The Provocation of Quraysh
  - 1. The Situation at the Hijrah
  - 2. The Earliest Expedition
  - 3. The First Fighting
  - 4. The Battle of Badr
  - 5. The Situation after Badr
- II. The Failure of the Meccan Ripost
  - 1. Muhammad prepares for the impending Struggle
  - 2. Meccan Reactions to Badr
  - 3. The Battle of Uhud
  - 4. The Rousing of the Nomads
  - 5. The Siege of Medina
- III. The Winning of the Meccans
  - 1. The Expeditions in the Year after the Siege
  - 2. The Expedition and Treaty of Al-Hudaybiyah
  - 3. After Al-Hudaybiyah
  - 4. Meccan Reactions to Muhammad's Successes
  - 5. The Submission of Mecca
  - 6. The Battle of Hunayn
  - 7. The Consolidation of Victory
- IV. The Unifying of the Arabs
  - 1. The Tribal System confronting Muhammad
  - 2. The Tribes to the West of Medina and Mecca
  - 3. The Tribes to the East of Medina and Mecca
  - 4. The Tribes to the North
  - 5. The Tribes to the South of Mecca
  - 6. The Tribes in the Rest of Arabia
  - 7. The Success of Muhammad's Policy
- V. The Internal Politics of Medina
  - 1. Social and Political Groupings before Muhammad
  - 2. Muhammad's Supporters
  - 3. The Muslim Opposition
- VI. Muhammad and the Jews
  - 1. The Jews of Yathrib
  - 2. The Jews at the Hijrah
  - 3. Muhammad's Attempts to Reconcile the Jews
  - 4. The Intellectual Attack on the Jews
  - 5. The Physical Attack on the Jews
  - 6. Conclusion
- VII. The Character of the Islamic State
  - 1. The Constitution of Medina
  - 2. The Position of Muhammad
  - 3. The Character of the Ummah
  - 4. Finance
- VIII. The Reform of the Social Structure
  - 1. Security of Life and Property
  - 2. Marriage and Family
  - 3. Inheritance
  - 4. Miscellaneous Reforms
  - 5. Conclusion
- IX. The New Religion
  - 1. The Religious Institutions of Islam
  - 2. Islam and Arab Paganism
  - 3. Islam and Christianity
- X. The Man and his Greatness
  - 1. Appearance and Manner
  - 2. The Alleged Moral Failures
  - 3. The Foundations of Greatness
- Excursus
  - A. Further Remarks on the Sources
  - B. List of Expeditions and Dates
  - C. Slaves and Freedman among the Emigrants at Badr
  - D. Muhammad's Letters to the Princes
  - E. "Those whose hearts are reconciled"
  - F. Texts of Selected Treaties
  - G. The Treaties with Dumat al-Jandal
  - H. List of Administrators sent out by Muhammad
  - I. Zakat and Sadaqah
  - J. Marriage and the Family in pre-Islamic times
  - K. The technical terms in Surahs 4.24/28, 5.5/7, and 24.33
  - L. Muhammad's Marriages
- Index

== See also ==
- Muhammad in Medina
