= Omar Koshan =

Shi'i festival celebrating the death of Umar

Omar Koshan 'Killing of Umar' عمرکشان
- Genre: Carnival-like Shi'i festival
- Begins: 9 Rabi' al-Awwal
- Ends: 27 Rabi' al-Awwal
- Frequency: Annually
- Country: Iran
- Established: 16th century
- Founders: Safavids
- Previous event: 23 August to 10 September 2026
- Next event: 12 August to 30 August 2027
- Major events: Historical: celebrating Abu Lu'lu'a's assassination of Umar ibn al-Khattab (644) Contemporary: celebrating the death of Umar ibn Sa'd (c. 686)

Omar Koshan (Persian: عمرکشان, "the Killing of Umar"), also known as Jashn-e Hazrat-e Zahra ("Celebration of Fatima al-Zahra'"), is a yearly festival held by some Twelver Shi'i Muslims in Iran. Originally, the festival commemorated the assassination of the second caliph Umar ibn al-Khattab (also spelled 'Omar', c. 583–644) by the Persian slave Abu Lu'lu'a Firuz.

In its current form, it begins on the 9th day of the month of Rabi' al-Awwal of the Islamic year, and lasts until the 27th of the same month. It is a carnival-type of festival in which social roles are reversed and communal norms upturned. It generally functions as a more lighthearted counterpart of the ta'ziyeh passion plays during the mourning of Muharram, which commemorate the death of the prophet Muhammad's grandson Husayn ibn Ali at the Battle of Karbala in 680.

First established in the 16th century during the Safavid conversion of Iran to Shi'i Islam, the festival was originally held around Abu Lu'lu'a's sanctuary in Kashan, each year at the anniversary of Umar's death on 26 Dhu al-Hijja of the Islamic year. However, later it also started to be observed elsewhere in Iran, sometimes on 9 Rabi' al-Awwal rather than on 26 Dhu al-Hijja.

The festival celebrated Abu Lu'lu'a, nicknamed for the occasion Bābā Shujāʿ al-Dīn (lit. 'Father Courageous of the Faith'), as a national hero who had defended the religion by killing the oppressive caliph. Umar was not only seen as a persecutor of non-Arabs, he was also thought to have threatened and injured the prophet Muhammad's daughter and Ali's wife Fatima, who had cursed him for this. Being related to the more general institution in early Safavid Iran of the ritual cursing of the first three Rashidun caliphs (who were all seen to have displaced Ali as the rightful caliph), the festival involved the beating and burning of effigies of Umar, accompanied by the recitation of vilifying poetry (sabb) and cursing (laʿn).

However, during the Qajar period (1789–1925) the ritual cursing and humiliation of the first three caliphs was gradually abandoned due to the improving political relations with the Sunni Ottomans. By the beginning of the 20th century, the festival of Omar Koshan had fallen into disuse in the major cities of Iran, surviving only in the countryside. This evolution, further spurred on by the rise of Pan-Islamism (an ideology advocating the unity of all Muslims, both Shi'is and Sunnis) in the late 19th century, reached a height with the Islamic Revolution in 1979, after which the ritual was officially banned in the Islamic Republic of Iran.

Nevertheless, the festival itself is still celebrated in Iran, though often secretly and indoors rather than outdoors. In these contemporary celebrations, there is a lapse of historical consciousness, where the idea has taken root that the Umar involved was not the second caliph Umar ibn al-Khattab, but the leader of the troops who killed Ali's son Husayn ibn Ali at the Battle of Karbala in 680, Umar ibn Sa'd (died c. 686). There is also a shift of focus away from Umar and towards Fatima, the festival being seen as an occasion to strengthen one's devotion to Fatima and one's self-identification as a Shi'i Muslim.

== See also ==
- Shrine of Abu Lu'lu'a in Kashan, probably the original location of the festival
