= Muhammad at Mecca =

1953 book by William Montgomery Watt

Muhammad at Mecca is a book about the Islamic prophet Muhammad, specifically about the first phase of his public mission, which concern his years in Mecca until the hijra to Medina. It was written by the non-Muslim Islamic scholar W. Montgomery Watt and published by Oxford University Press in 1953.

Watt's 1956 book Muhammad at Medina forms its sequel. Later a popular abridgement of these two volumes was published, Muhammad Prophet and Statesman (1961).

== Contents ==
- Introduction
- I. The Arabian Background
  - 1. Economic Basis
  - 2. Meccan Politics
  - 3. The Social and Moral Background
  - 4. The Religious and Intellectual Background
- II. Muhammad's Early Life and Prophetical Call
  - 1. Muhammad's Ancestry
  - 2. Birth and Early Years
  - 3. Marriage with Khadijah
  - 4. The Call to be a Prophet
  - 5. The Form of Muhammad's Prophetic Consciousness
  - 6. The Chronology of the Meccan Period
- III. The Primary Message
  - 1. The Dating of the Qur'an
  - 2. The Contents of the Early Passages
  - 3. The Relevance of the Message to the Contemporary Situation
  - 4. Further Reflections
- IV. The First Muslims
  - 1. Traditional Accounts of the Early Converts
  - 2. Survey of the Earliest Muslims
  - 3. The Appeal of Muhammad's Message
- V. The Growth of Opposition
  - 1. The Beginning of Opposition; the 'Satanic Verses'
  - 2. The Abyssinian Affair
  - 3. The Manoeuvres of the Opposition
  - 4. The Witness of the Qur'an
  - 5. The Leaders of the Opposition and their Motives
- VI. Expanding Horizons
  - 1. The Deterioration in Muhammad's Position
  - 2. The Visit to at-Ta'if
  - 3. Approaches to the Nomadic Tribes
  - 4. Negotiations with Medina
  - 5. The Hijrah
  - 6. The Meccan Achievement
- Excursus
  - A. The Ahabish
  - B. Arabian Monotheism and Judaeo-Christian Influence
  - C. The Hanifs
  - D. Tazakka, &c.
  - E. List of Meccan Muslims and Pagans
  - F. The Traditions of 'Urwah
  - G. The Emigration to Abyssinia; the various Lists
  - H. The Return of the Emigrants from Abyssinia
- Index

== Editions ==
- 1953: Oxford University Press
- 1993: Kazi Pubns Inc, ISBN 0-19-577277-6
- 2004: Oxford University Press, ISBN 0-19-577278-4
