= God's Caliph =

Book about early Islam by Patricia Crone and Martin Hinds

God's Caliph: Religious Authority in the First Centuries of Islam
- Authors: Patricia Crone; Martin Hinds
- Language: English
- Subject: Caliphate
- Genre: Non-fiction
- Published: 1986
- Publisher: Cambridge University Press
- ISBN: 0521541115
- OCLC: 1080930334

God's Caliph: Religious Authority in the First Centuries of Islam is a book co-authored by Middle East Scholars and historiographers of early Islam Patricia Crone and Martin Hinds.

The book examines how religious authority was distributed in early Islam. It argues the case that, as in Shi`ism, religious authority was concentrated in the head of state, rather than dispersed among learned laymen as in Sunnism.

Crone and Hinds argue that originally the caliph was both head of state and ultimate source of religious law; and that such ideas persisted during the Umayyad Caliphate. To Crone and Hinds, the Sunni pattern represents the outcome of a conflict between the caliphs and early scholars who, as spokesmen of the community, assumed religious leadership for themselves. Many Islamicists have assumed the Shi`i concept of the imamate to be a deviant development. In contrast, this book argues that it is an archaism preserving the concept of religious authority with which all Muslims began.

== Contents ==
1. Introduction
2. The title khalifat Allah
3. The Umayyad conception of the caliphate
4. Caliphal law
5. From caliphal to Prophetic sunna
6. Epilogue; Appendices; Index.
