= Meccan Trade and the Rise of Islam =

Book by Patricia Crone

- Cover
- Author: Patricia Crone
- Language: English
- Subject: Islam
- Published: 1987 (Gorgias Press)
- Media type: Print
- ISBN: 1-59333-102-9
- OCLC: 57718221

Meccan Trade And The Rise Of Islam is a 1987 book written by scholar and historiographer of early Islam Patricia Crone. The book argues that Islam did not originate in Mecca, located in western Saudi Arabia, but in northern Arabia. Her views are hugely different from those of historians and orientalist scholars like W. Montgomery Watt and Fred Donner, who have publications detailing trade activities and the struggles between competing Meccan tribes for control over trade routes.

== Content ==
Crone found no evidence of Mecca being an important trading center in late antiquity of 6th and 7th century CE:

- Mecca was not on the overland trade route from Southern Arabia to Syria
- Even if it had been, the overland trade route from Southern Arabia to Syria was not very important compared to the maritime trade route
- By the end of the second century AD at latest, the route was no longer in use
- A close examination of the Muslim sources themselves show that, except for Yemeni perfume, the Meccans traded mainly in cheap leather goods and clothing, and occasionally, in basic foodstuffs (clarified butter and cheese)
- These goods were not exported to Syria, which already had plenty of them, but were supplied almost exclusively to inhabitants of the Peninsula.

If it is obvious that if the Meccans had been middlemen in a long-distance trade of the kind described in traditional Islamic literature, there ought to have been some mention of it in the writings of their customers who wrote extensively about the south Arabians who supplied them with aromatics. Despite the considerable attention paid to Arabian affairs there is no mention at all of Quraysh (the tribe of Mohammed) and their trading center Mecca, be it in the Greek, Latin, Syriac, Aramaic, Coptic, or other literature composed outside Arabia.

She concludes that "Meccans did not trade outside of Mecca on the eve of Islam". That there was no continuous transmission of historical fact through the three generations or so that separated the early first/seventh century from the mid-second/eight century" and that the lines of transmission of the accounts were "pure fabrications".

Crone also found Islamic "traditions" to be unreliable, conflicting "with each other so often and so regularly `that one could were one so inclined, rewrite most of Montgomery Watt's biography of Muhammad in the reverse.'"

An examination of all available evidence and sources leads Crone to conclude that Mohammed's career took place not in Mecca and Medina or in southwest Arabia at all, but in northwest Arabia.

== Reception ==
Robert Bertram Serjeant described the book as a "confused, irrational and illogical polemic, further complicated by her misunderstanding of Arabic texts, her lack of comprehension of the social structure of Arabia, and twisting of the clear sense of other writings, ancient and modern, to suit her contentions."

Fred Donner, on the other hand, stated that "[the] assumption that Mecca was the linchpin of international luxury trade [has] been decisively challenged in recent years – notably in Patricia Crone, Meccan Trade and the Rise of Islam.", although Patricia Crone's theory has been challenged by Robert Bertram Serjeant who favored the Meccan trade theory.
