= Yasin Dutton =

Islamic studies scholar

Academic background
- Education: University of Oxford (DPhil)

Academic work
- Discipline: Arabic; Islamic studies
- Sub-discipline: Islamic jurisprudence
- Institutions: University of Oxford (1993-5); University of Edinburgh (1995-2006); University of Cape Town (2006-2018)

Yasin Dutton is the Azman Hashim Senior Research Fellow at the Oxford Centre for Islamic Studies and Emeritus Professor of Arabic in the School of Languages & Literature at the University of Cape Town. His research interests include early Quranic manuscripts and both classical and modern Islamic law, with an emphasis on economic and environmental issues.

== Academic career ==
Dutton completed his DPhil at the University of Oxford before teaching Arabic at its Faculty of Oriental Studies from 1993 to 1995, Arabic and Islamic studies at the University of Edinburgh from 1995 to 2006, and Arabic at the University of Cape Town from 2006 to 2018.

== Research ==
Dutton's research into early Islamic law focused on the jurisprudence of Malik ibn Anas and his use of the practices of the people of Medina (amal ahl al-madina) as a source of law. He is of the view that in addition to the Quran, amal ahl al-madina was an overruling authority for Malik, more so than hadith. Using the issue of the placement of hands during prayer, i.e. sadl vs qabd, Dutton makes a distinction between the sunnah as preserved by amal and the sunnah as preserved by hadith.

He is said to have made "a significant contribution to our understanding of the juristic activity in early Islam".

== Publications ==
- The Origins of Islamic Law: The Qur'an, the Muwatta' and Madinan Amal (Culture and Civilization in the Middle East), (Routledge, 1999, ISBN 978-0-70071-062-1)
- Original Islam: Malik and the Madhhab of Madina (Culture and Civilization in the Middle East), (Routledge, 2006, ISBN 978-0-41555-407-7)
- The Codicology of Islamic Manuscripts : Proceedings of the Second Conference of Al-Furqān Islamic Heritage Foundation, 4–5 December 1993 (2nd ed.) London: Al-Furqān Islamic Heritage Foundation. ISBN 978-1873992159

=== Articles ===
- Dutton, Yasin. “The Introduction to Ibn Rushd's ‘Bidāyat Al-Mujtahid.’” Islamic Law and Society, vol. 1, no. 2, 1994, pp. 188–205.
- Dutton, Yasin. “‘Sunna’, ‘Ḥadīth’, and Madinan ‘ʿAmal.’” Journal of Islamic Studies, vol. 4, no. 1, 1993, pp. 1–31.
- Dutton, Yasin. “ʿAmal v Ḥadīth in Islamic Law the Case of Sadl Al-Yadayn (Holding One's Hands by One's Sides) When Doing the Prayer.” Islamic Law and Society, vol. 3, no. 1, 1996, pp. 13–40.
- Dutton, Yasin. “Red Dots, Green Dots, Yellow Dots and Blue: Some Reflections on the Vocalisation of Early Qur'anic Manuscripts — Part I.” Journal of Qur'anic Studies, vol. 1, no. 1, 1999, pp. 115–140.
- Dutton, Yasin. “Red Dots, Green Dots, Yellow Dots and Blue: Some Reflections on the Vocalisation of Early Qur'anic Manuscripts (Part II).” Journal of Qur'anic Studies, vol. 2, no. 1, 2000, pp. 1–24.
- Dutton, Yasin. “Orality, Literacy and the 'Seven Aḥruf ' Ḥadīth.” Journal of Islamic Studies, vol. 23, no. 1, 2012, pp. 1–49.
- Dutton, Yasin. “An Umayyad Fragment of the Qur'an and Its Dating.” Journal of Qur'anic Studies, vol. 9, no. 2, 2007, pp. 57–87.
- Dutton, Yasin. “An Early Muṣḥaf According to the Reading of Ibn ʿĀmir.” Journal of Qur'anic Studies, vol. 3, no. 1, 2001, pp. 71–89.
- Dutton, Yasin. “Some Notes on the British Library's 'Oldest Qur'an Manuscript' (Or. 2165).” Journal of Qur'anic Studies, vol. 6, no. 1, 2004, pp. 43–71.
- Dutton, Yasin. “Juridical Practice and Madinan ʿAmal: Qada' in the Muwaṭṭaʾ of Mālik” Journal of Islamic Studies, vol. 10, no. 1, 1999, pp. 1–21.
