= Muhammad: The Messenger of God (book) =

Muhammad, The Messenger of God (ISBN 0-06-250886-5) is a book about Islam written by Betty Kelen. See also identity of first male Muslim.
