= Wilferd Madelung =

German-American scholar of Islamic history (1930–2023)

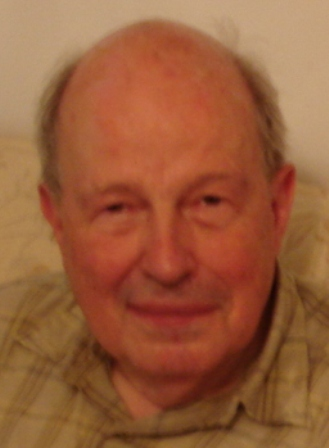
- Madelung in 2006
- Born: 26 December 1930; Stuttgart, Germany
- Died: 9 May 2023 (aged 92)
- Education: Georgetown University, University of Hamburg
- Occupations: Author, scholar

Wilferd Ferdinand Madelung, FBA (26 December 1930 – 9 May 2023) was a German author and scholar of Islamic history widely recognised for his contributions to the fields of Islamic and Iranian studies. He was appreciated in Iran for his "knowledgeable and fair" treatment of the Shia perspective. In the obituary of the Institute of Ismaili Studies (London) where Madelung worked his last years, it reads: "With particular reference to religious schools and movements in early Islam, his studies, based on a vast array of primary sources, have enriched the discipline’s understanding of almost every major Muslim movement and community – not only early Imami Shi‘ism and the later developments of Twelver, Ismaili and Zaydi Islam but also the lesser known aspects of Sunni, Khariji and the Mu‘tazili schools of theology and philosophy."

== Early life and career ==
Madelung was born in Stuttgart on 26 December 1930. After World War II (in 1947), as an adolescent, he accompanied his parents Georg Hans Madelung and Elisabeth Emma Madelung to the US where his father continued his career as an aeronautic engineer specialising in rockets. Wilferd Madelung enrolled at Georgetown University in Washington DC before going to Cairo in 1951 to study Arabic literature and Islamic history; there he was a student of "Muḥammad Kamil Ḥusayn (1901–1961), who edited numerous Ismaili texts of the Fatimid period". From 1958 to 1960, he served as cultural attaché at the West German Embassy in Baghdad, before starting his scientific career. Later, Madelung was apparently also holding British citizenship.

== Academic career ==
Madelung received his doctorate and habilitation at the University of Hamburg in Germany (lecturer for Islamic studies 1963–1966). His PhD thesis from 1957 was titled "The Qarmatians and the Fatimids. Their mutual relations and their teachings on the Imamate". He was a visiting professor at the University of Texas at Austin in 1963, and assistant professor (1964–65), associate professor (1966–68) and professor of Islamic History from 1969 until 1978 at the University of Chicago. He was the Laudian Professor of Arabic at the University of Oxford and a Fellow of St John’s College there from 1978 to 1998.

During this time, his 1997 book The Succession to Muhammad was celebrated as a landmark work in the equitable depiction of Shia views on the Islamic succession process following the death of Muhammad. Madelung also wrote academic journal articles and lectures about Ibadism. From 1999, he was a member of the British Academy, and a senior research fellow at the Institute for Ismaili Studies in London.

In 2013, he was awarded the Farabi International Award by the Iranian Ministry of Islamic Guidance and Culture for his significant contributions to the fields of Islamic and Iranian studies. Later, Madelung was also involved in publishing early Arabic writings of spiritually oriented alchemy (see list of publications).

== Personal life ==
He was married to Margaret Madelung.

== Death ==
Madelung died on 9 May 2023 at the age of 92.

== Works ==
Already 20 years before dying he had produced some 15 books and edited volumes, 60 book chapters and papers in scientific journals, 130 encyclopaedia entries and about 160 book reviews.

- Madelung, W. (editor) - Arabic Texts Concerning The History of The Zaydī Imāms of Tabaristān, Daylamān And Gīlān, collected and edited by Wilferd Madelung. Franz Steiner Verlag, Beirut and Wiesbaden, 1987.
- Madelung, W. - Religious Trends in Early Islamic Iran. Columbia Letters of Iranian Studies no. 4, The Persian Heritage Foundation, 1988. ISBN 0-88706-700-X / 0-88706-701-8 (pbk.).
- Madelung, W. - Religious and Ethnic Movements in Medieval Islam, Ashgate Publishing, 1992. (New editions from 2016 on by Routledge, Oxon and New York, ISBN 978-086078-310-7
- Madelung, W. - The Succession to Muhammad, Cambridge University Press, 1997, ISBN 0521646960.
- Madelung, W. and Walker, P. - An Ismaili Heresiography: The 'Bāb al-Shayṭān' from Abū Tammāms' Kitāb al-shajara, Leiden, 1998.
- Madelung, W. and Walker, P. - The Advent of the Fatimids: A Contemporary Shi'i Witness. An Edition and English Translation of Ibn al-Haytham’s Kitab al-Munazarat, by Wilferd Madelung and Paul E. Walker. I.B. Tauris, London, 2000, ISBN 1-86064-551-8. (Published online by Cambridge University Press in 2016.)
- Madelung, W. - Der Imam al-Qasim ibn Ibrahim und die Glaubenslehre der Zaiditen, Walter De Gruyter Incorporated, 2002 (first edition 1966), ISBN 9783110826548.
- Aḥmad b. Yaḥyā al-Balāḏurī: Ansāb al-Ašrāf (Part 2). Edited by Wilferd Madelung. Beirut, 2003.
- Muhammad Ibn Umail: Book of the Explanation of the Symbols. Kitāb Ḥall ar-Rumūz (Corpus Alchemicum Arabicum. Vol. I). Edited by Theodor Abt, Wilferd Madelung, Thomas Hofmeier, with Introduction by Theodor Abt. Living Human Heritage Publications, Zurich, 2003; ISBN 3-9522608-1-9.
- Madelung, W. - Religious schools and sects in medieval Islam, Variorum Reprints, 1985.
- Madelung, W. (editor) - The Book of the Rank of the Sage. Rutbat al-Ḥakīm by Maslama al-Qurṭubī. Arabic Text edited with an English Introduction by Wilferd Madelung. Corpus Alchemicum Arabicum IV. Living Human Heritage Publications, Zurich 2016.
- Ibāḍī Texts from the 2nd/8th Century
- Muhammad Ibn Umail: The Pure Pearl and other texts by Muhammad Ibn Umail. Ad-Durra an-naqīya, As-Sīra an-naqīya, Al-Qașīda al-Mīmīya, Al-Mabāqil as-sab'a (Corpus Alchemicum Arabicum. Vol. V). Arabic Edition by Wilferd Madelung with an Introduction by Theodor Abt. Translation by Salwa Fuad and Theodor Abt. Living Human Heritage Publications, Zurich, 2019; ISBN 978-3-9524468-3-6.

== Award ==
- Farabi International Award (2013)

== See also ==
- List of Islamic scholars
