= Patricia Crone =

Danish Orientalist and historian (1945–2015)

- Crone in 2015
- Born: 28 March 1945; Kyndeløse Sydmark, Rye Parish, Lejre Municipality, Denmark
- Died: 11 July 2015 (aged 70); Princeton, New Jersey, U.S.

Academic work
- Main interests: Islamic studies; Quranic (Islamic) studies; scriptural exegesis; scholarship on Islamic origins
- Notable works: Hagarism (with Michael Cook); Meccan Trade and the Rise of Islam

Patricia Crone (28 March 1945 – 11 July 2015) was a Danish historian specialising in early Islamic history. Crone was a member of the revisionist school of Islamic studies and questioned the historicity of the Islamic traditions about the beginnings of Islam.

== Early life, family and education ==
Crone was born in Kyndeløse Sydmark (south of Kyndeløse) 23 km northwest of Roskilde in Roskilde County, Denmark on 28 March 1945.

After taking the forprøve (preliminary exam) at University of Copenhagen, she went to Paris to learn French, and then to London, United Kingdom where she was determined to get into a university to become fluent in English. In 1974, she earned her Doctor of Philosophy (PhD) degree at the School of Oriental and African Studies, University of London with a thesis titled "The Mawali in the Umayyad period". She was then a senior research fellow at the Warburg Institute until 1977. She was accepted as an occasional student at King's College London and followed a course in medieval European history, especially church-state relations.

== Career ==
In 1977, Crone became a University Lecturer in Islamic history and a fellow of Jesus College, Oxford. She then became Assistant University Lecturer in Islamic studies and fellow of Gonville and Caius College, Cambridge, in 1990 and held several positions at Cambridge. She served as University Lecturer in Islamic studies from 1992 to 1994, and as Reader in Islamic history from 1994 to 1997.

In 1997, she was appointed to the Institute for Advanced Study in Princeton, where she was named as Andrew W. Mellon Professor. In 2001, she was elected to the American Philosophical Society. From 2002 until her death in 2015, she was a member of the Editorial Board of the journal Social Evolution & History.

== Research ==
The major theme of Patricia Crone's scholarly life was the fundamental questioning of the historicity of Islamic sources which concern the beginnings of Islam. Her two best-known works concentrate on this topic: Hagarism and Meccan Trade. Three decades after Hagarism, Fred Donner called Crone's work a "milestone" in the field of Orientalist study of Islam.

Though she began as a scholar of broader military and economic history of the Near and Middle East, Crone's later career focused mainly on "the Qur'an and the cultural and religious traditions of Iraq, Iran, and the formerly Iranian part of Central Asia".

=== Hagarism (1977) ===
In their book Hagarism (1977), Crone and her associate Michael Cook, both then working at the School of Oriental and African Studies in London, provided a new analysis of early Islamic history. They fundamentally questioned the historicity of the Islamic traditions about the beginnings of Islam. They tried to produce a picture of Islam's beginnings only from non-Arabic sources. By studying the only surviving contemporary accounts of the rise of Islam, which were written in Armenian, Greek, Aramaic and Syriac by actual witnesses, they reconstructed a story of Islam's beginnings that differs from the story told by Islamic traditions. Crone and Cook claimed to be able to explain exactly how Islam came into being by the fusion of various Near Eastern civilisations under Arabic leadership.

Fred M. Donner viewed the book as a "wake-up call": despite initial repudiation, it set a milestone by pointing out that scholars need to "consider a much more varied body of source material than most were used to using, or trained to use". On the other hand, he criticised the book's indiscriminate use of non-Muslim sources and the "labyrinthine" arguments incomprehensible even to many who had strong specialist training.

Oleg Grabar described Hagarism as a "brilliant, fascinating, original, arrogant, highly debatable book" and writes that "the authors' fascination with lapidary formulas led them to cheap statements or to statements which require unusual intellectual gymnastics to comprehend and which become useless, at best cute" and that "... the whole construction proposed by the authors lacks entirely in truly historical foundations" while also praising the authors for trying to "relate the Muslim phenomenon to broad theories of acculturation and historical change".

Robert Bertram Serjeant wrote that Hagarism is "not only bitterly anti-Islamic in tone, but anti-Arabian. Its superficial fancies are so ridiculous that at first one wonders if it is just a 'leg pull', pure 'spoof'".

Michael G. Morony remarked that "Despite a useful bibliography, this is a thin piece of Kulturgeschichte full of glib generalisations, facile assumptions, and tiresome jargon. More argument than evidence, it suffers all the problems of intellectual history, including reification and logical traps".

Later, Crone backed away from some proposals in this reconstruction of Islam's beginnings. She continued to maintain the basic results of her work:

- The historicity of Islamic sources on Islam's beginnings has to be fundamentally questioned.
- Islam has deep roots in Judaism, and Arabs and Jews were allies.
- Not Mecca but a different place in northwestern Arabia was the cradle of Islam.

=== Meccan Trade and the Rise of Islam (1987) ===
In Meccan Trade and the Rise of Islam (1987), Crone argued that the importance of the pre-Islamic Meccan trade had been grossly exaggerated. Furthermore, she found that Mecca was never part of any of the major ancient trade routes. She also suggested that while Muhammad never traveled much beyond the Hijaz, internal evidence in the Qur'an, such as its description of his opponents as "olive growers", might indicate that the events surrounding Muhammed took place nearer the Mediterranean than in Mecca.

The book was well-received by other revisionist scholars such as Frederick S. Paxton and Fred Donner, but received bitter polemics from conservative and Muslim scholars.

== Death ==
In November 2011, Crone was diagnosed with lung cancer that had already spread to the brain; she died on 11 July 2015, aged 70.

== Bibliography ==
=== Coauthor ===
- with Michael Cook, Hagarism: The Making of the Islamic World, Cambridge: Cambridge University Press, first published in 1977; ISBN 0-521-21133-6 Free online version at archive.org
- with Martin Hinds, God's Caliph: Religious Authority in the First Centuries of Islam (first published 1986); ISBN 0-521-54111-5
- with Shmuel Moreh, The Book of Strangers: Medieval Arabic Graffiti on the Theme of Nostalgia (1999) Princeton Series on the Middle-East; ISBN 978-1558762152
- with Fritz Zimmermann, The epistle of Sālim ibn Dhakwān (2001) Oxford/New York: Oxford University Press; ISBN 0-19-815265-5.

=== Sole author ===
- Slaves on Horses: The Evolution of the Islamic Polity (1980); ISBN 0-521-52940-9
- Meccan Trade and the Rise of Islam (1987); ISBN 1-59333-102-9
- Roman, Provincial and Islamic Law : The Origins of the Islamic Patronate (1987, Paperback: 2002); ISBN 0-521-52949-2
- Pre-Industrial Societies: Anatomy of the Pre-Modern World (2003); ISBN 1-85168-311-9
- God's Rule: Government and Islam - Six Centuries of Medieval Islamic Political Thought (2004). Columbia University Press; ISBN 0-231-13290-5/ISBN 0-231-13291-3.
- Medieval Islamic Political Thought (2005). Edinburgh University Press; ISBN 0-7486-2194-6
- From Arabian Tribes to Islamic Empire : Army, State and Society in the Near East c. 600–850 (2008); ISBN 978-0-7546-5925-9
- The Nativist Prophets of Early Islamic Iran: Rural Revolt and Local Zoroastrianism (2012). Cambridge University Press; ISBN 978-1107018792
- Jewish Christianity and the Qurʾān (Part One)." Journal of Near Eastern Studies 74.2 (2015): 225-253.
- Jewish Christianity and The Qurʾān (Part Two). Journal of Near Eastern Studies 75.1 (2016): 1-21.

=== Articles ===
- Patricia Crone, "How Did the Quranic Pagans Make a Living?", Bulletin of the School of Oriental and African Studies, University of London, Vol. 68, No. 3 (2005), pp. 387–399
- Patricia Crone, "Quraysh and the Roman army: Making sense of the Meccan leather trade", Bulletin of the School of Oriental and African Studies, University of London, Vol. 70 (2007), pp. 63–88
- Patricia Crone, "Barefoot and Naked: What Did the Bedouin of the Arab Conquests Look Like?", in Muqarnas Vol. 25, Brill (2008), pp. 1–10,

=== Semi-popular articles ===
- Patricia Crone, "'Jihad': idea and history", Open Democracy, April 30, 2007.
- Patricia Crone, "What do we actually know about Mohammed?", Open Democracy, June 10, 2008.
