= Siege of Emesa (638) =

638 CE Byzantine siege of Rashidun Caliphate-occupied Syrian city

Coordinates: 34.723185°N 36.714462°E

- Part of the Muslim conquest of Syria (Arab–Byzantine wars)
Date	638 AD/17 AH
Location	Emesa, Syria
Result	Rashidun Caliphate victory
Territorial changes	Emesa remained in Rashidun possession

Belligerents
Rashidun Caliphate	Byzantine Empire; Arab Christians

Commanders and leaders
Abu Ubayda ibn al-Jarrah; Khalid ibn al-Walid; Iyad ibn Ghanm; Habib ibn Maslama al-Fihri; Al-Qa'qa' ibn Amr al-Tamimi	Heraclius

Strength
Unknown number of garrison forces; 4,000 reinforcements from Iraq	Unknown

Casualties and losses
Unknown	Heavy

The siege of Emesa in 638 was laid by a coalition force of Arab Christian tribes from Jazira which was mustered by Heraclius in an attempt to stem the losses of Byzantine territories due to the rapid expansion of the Rashidun Caliphate in the Levant.

== Background ==
After the devastating defeat in the Battle of the Yarmuk, the remainder of the Byzantine Empire was left vulnerable. With few military resources left, it was no longer in a position to attempt a military comeback in Syria. To gain time to prepare a defense of the rest of his empire, Heraclius needed the Muslims occupied in Syria.

Heraclius thus sought help from the Christian Arab tribes which came of Jazirah particularly from two cities along the Euphrates river, Circesium and Hīt. The tribes mustered a large army and marched against Emesa in no time, which was erected as military headquarter by Abu Ubayda at the time.

== Caliphate strategy ==
Acknowledging a huge Arab Christian army marching to his position, Abu Ubayda withdrew all his forces from northern Syria to Emesa as a part of a complex strategy which he devised to repel the massive invasion of the Christian Arabs against Emesa, while Caliph Umar instructed Abu Ubayda to send his field commanders outside of Emesa with sufficient splinter forces to lay counter siege to cities in Jazira, the homeland of enemy Arab Christian tribes, in order to divert the focus of enemy concentration in Emesa. The splinter forces were placed under the command of Iyad ibn Ghanm. In 638, the Muslims attacked Hīt, which they found to be well fortified; thus, they left a fraction of the army to impose a siege on the city, while the rest went after Circesium. Iyadh in turn sent Habib ibn Maslama al-Fihri toward Circesium taking with him a particular division of Banu Kilab known as Corps of 'Amr, which are famed for their 'militant and warlike attitude. The division is directly under the leadership of Aslam ibn Zur'a al-Kilabi along with al-Harith ibn Yazid and his son Zufar ibn al-Harith.

Meanwhile, Umar sent a detachment from Iraq to invade Jazirah from three different routes. Umar himself marched from Medina with 1,000 men. On the orders of Umar, Sa'd ibn Abi Waqqas, who had recently conquered Iraq, sent Another detachment to assist Emesa under Al-Qa'qa' ibn Amr al-Tamimi, a prominent veteran of both Battle of Yarmouk and Battle of Qadisiyyah. Another detachment from Suhayl ibn 'Uday followed al-Farad road until they reached Raqqa.

== Siege ==
After the large contingent of Arab Christians came from Jazira has been mustered, they immediately marched to Homs, which immediately laid siege to the city. As Khalid just returned from conquest of Qinnasrin, he immediately appealed to Abu Ubaydah to be sent outside so he could lead the sally outside the wall, However Abu Ubaidah decided they should wait behind the wall, while he waited for reinforcements

=== Counter siege ===
The sieges toward Circessium and Hit laid by corps under Iyadh occurred simultaneously as the siege of Homs goes on. At first the Muslims faced difficulty in the siege of Hit as the defenders dug a moat around the city, until the Muslim army was able to penetrate it. Meanwhile, Circesium was captured from the Byzantines without resistance by a Muslim army commanded by Habib, Though many Muslim sources state this occurred in 637, Maximillan Streck stated it is more likely occurred in 640.

The counter sieges did not stop at Circesium and Hit, as Iyad further sent al-Walid ibn Uqba to subdue the fortresses of the tribe of Rabi'a and Tanukhid. Abu Ubaydah strategy of counter siege toward Circesium and Hit not only resulted in a Muslim victory at the Second Battle of Emesa against the pro-Byzantine Christian Arabs of Jazira, but also succeeded to take both Circesium and Hit, while the Christian Arabs were still being pursued by Khalid and his relentless cavalry. Between the end of 639 and December 640, Iyad and his lieutenants subdued, in succession, Circesium, Amid, Mayyafariqin, Nisibin, Tur Abdin, Mardin, Dara, Qarda and Bazabda. In the case of Raqqa (Kallinikos to the Byzantines), the peasants outside the city walls were defended by the Arab Christian nomads. There, the Muslim forces compelled the city's leaders, facing the prospect of starvation, to surrender within five or six days. As the city fell to the Muslims, Since then, it has figured in Arabic sources as al-Raqqah.

=== End of siege ===
When the Christian Arabs received the news of the arrival of fresh reinforcements led by the caliph himself, combined with Iyad's invasions of their homeland in Jazira, they immediately abandoned the siege and hastily withdrew there. By the time the Christian Arab coalitions left, Khalid and his mobile guard has been reinforced by 4000 soldiers under Qa'qa from Iraq, and now had been given permission by Abu Ubaydah to came out of the fort to pursue the enemy. Khalid inflicted heavy losses on the Arab Christian coalition forces, which not only broke the entire siege, but also prevented their return to Jazira.

In summary, the objective of the Jazira invasion by Iyad to capture cities with minimal destruction and, in Petersen's view, Iyadh's campaign to partially divert the Christian Arab coalition forces in Syria, had succeeded.

== Aftermath ==
The success of the defense, which not only repelled the siege attempt by the Byzantine allies but also allowed Iyad to capture almost entire Jazira region, has motivated the caliphate to launch the full-scale invasion further to the north until it reached Armenia.

== See also ==
- Siege of Emesa
- Jund Hims
- Muslim conquest of Armenia

== Bibliography ==
- Al-Baladhuri (1916). Hitti, Philip Khuri (ed.). The Origins of the Islamic State, Volume 1. London: Columbia University, Longmans, Green & Co. OCLC 622246259.
- Canard, M. (1965). "Al-Djazīra". In Lewis, B.; Pellat, Ch. & Schacht, J. (eds.). The Encyclopaedia of Islam, Second Edition. Volume II: C–G. Leiden: E. J. Brill. pp. 523–524. OCLC 495469475.OCLC 192262392
- Streck, M. (1978). "Karkisiya". In van Donzel, E.; Lewis, B.; Pellat, Ch. & Bosworth, C. E. (eds.). The Encyclopaedia of Islam, Second Edition. Volume IV: Iran–Kha. Leiden: E. J. Brill. pp. 654–655. ISBN 978-90-04-05745-6. OCLC 758278456.
- Meinecke, Michael (1995). "al-Raḳḳa". The Encyclopedia of Islam, New Edition, Volume VIII: Ned–Sam. Leiden and New York: BRILL. pp. 410–414. ISBN 90-04-09834-8.
- Petersen, Leif Inge Ree (2013). Siege Warfare and Military Organization in the Successor States (400-800 AD): Byzantium, the West and Islam. Leiden: Brill. ISBN 978-90-04-25199-1.
- Canard, Marius & Cahen, Claude (1960). "Armīniya". In Gibb, H. A. R.; Kramers, J. H.; Lévi-Provençal, E.; Schacht, J.; Lewis, B. & Pellat, Ch. (eds.). The Encyclopaedia of Islam, Second Edition. Volume I: A–B. Leiden: E. J. Brill. pp. 634–640. OCLC 495469456.
