= Siege of Raqqa (639) =

Siege of the Arab–Byzantine wars

Conquest of Raqqa (639)
- Part of the Muslim conquest of Syria (Arab–Byzantine wars)
Date	August 639
Location	Raqqa, Syria
Result	Rashidun victory

Belligerents
Rashidun Caliphate	Byzantine Empire

Commanders and leaders
Iyad ibn Ghanm; Maysara ibn Masruq al-'Absi; Sa'id ibn Amir al-Jumahi; Safwan ibn al-Mu'attal al-Sulami	Unknown

Strength
5,000 men	Unknown

Casualties and losses
Unknown	Unknown

The Siege of Raqqa was a military engagement between the Muslim Rashidun army and the Byzantine garrison of Raqqa. The Muslims under Iyad ibn Ghanm launched their invasion of Mesopotamia and captured the city of Raqqa.

== Conquest ==
After the death of the Muslim commander Abu Ubayda ibn al-Jarrah in 639, the Rashidun Caliph Umar appointed Iyad ibn Ghanm as the governor of Hims, Qinnasrin, and Mesopotamia. On August 21st, Iyad marched towards Mesopotamia with an army of 5,000 men. The vanguard of the army was led by Maysara ibn Masruq al-'Absi, the right by Sa'id ibn Amir ibn Hidhyam al-Jumahi, and the left by Safwan ibn al-Mu'attal al-Sulami. The Muslim vanguard arrived at the city of Raqqa; there in the environs, the peasants were out under the protection of Christian Arab troops or Bedouins called by Al-Baladhuri. The vanguard carried a successful raid against them and captured considerable loot. The rest escaped to the city.

Shortly afterwards, the main Muslim army under Iyad arrived at the city. There he stood at one of the cities' gates called "Bab al-Ruha" and drew his troops into a formation to intimidate the city into submission. However, the cities' garrison responded by bombarding the Muslims with stones and arrows, wounding several Muslims. Iyad withdrew from the attack's range and began touring the entire city on horseback. The Muslim commander began placing cavalry guards at the city gates to prevent any garrison force or messenger from coming out and refugees from coming in. Later, he dispatched a force to go around the countryside, clearing any supplies and captives, which resulted in a large number of prisoners and food quantities.

Since the time of harvest arrived, it was impossible for the inhabitants to reap the crops. This lasted for five or six days until the Byzantine patrician asked for surrender. The Muslim commander granted the inhabitants security for their lives, children, and property. The Muslims imposed the Kharaj tax on the city, paid by wheat, oil, vinegar, and honey. A Jizya tax was imposed on men, but women and children were exempt. Afterwards, the inhabitants opened the city gates for the Muslims and allowed them to establish a market at "Bab al-Ruha."

== Aftermath ==
After their victory, the Muslims continued their Mesopotamian campaign, eventually subduing the cities of Edessa, Harran, Samsat, and all cities in Northern Mesopotamia. The Muslims imposed similar terms on these cities they conquered.

== Sources ==
- Philip Khuri Hitti (1916), The Origins of the Islamic State, Volume I.
- Hugh Kennedy (2022), History of the Arab Invasions: The Conquest of the Lands, A New Translation of Al-Baladhuri's Futuh Al-Buldan.
- Leif Inge Ree Petersen (2013), Siege Warfare and Military Organization in the Successor States (400-800 AD). Byzantium, the West and Islam.
