= Muslim conquest of Syria =

7th-century conquest by the Rashidun Caliphate

- Part of the Arab–Byzantine wars
- Map of the Rashidun Caliphate's invasions of the Byzantine Empire and the Sasanian Empire
Date	634–638 CE
Location	Byzantine Syria, (Note: Modern-day Israel, Jordan, Lebanon, Palestine, Syria, and southeastern Turkey.) administered under the Praetorian prefecture of the East
Result	Muslim victory
Territorial changes	Annexation of Byzantine Syria by the Rashidun Caliphate

Belligerents
Rashidun Caliphate	Byzantine Empire; Ghassanids; Tanukhids

Commanders and leaders
Abu Bakr; Umar; Khalid ibn al-Walid; Abu Ubayda ibn al-Jarrah; Amr ibn al-As; Yazid ibn Abi Sufyan; Shurahbil ibn Hasana; Iyad ibn Ghanm	Heraclius; Jabalah ibn al-Aiham; Theodore Trithyrius †; Vahan †

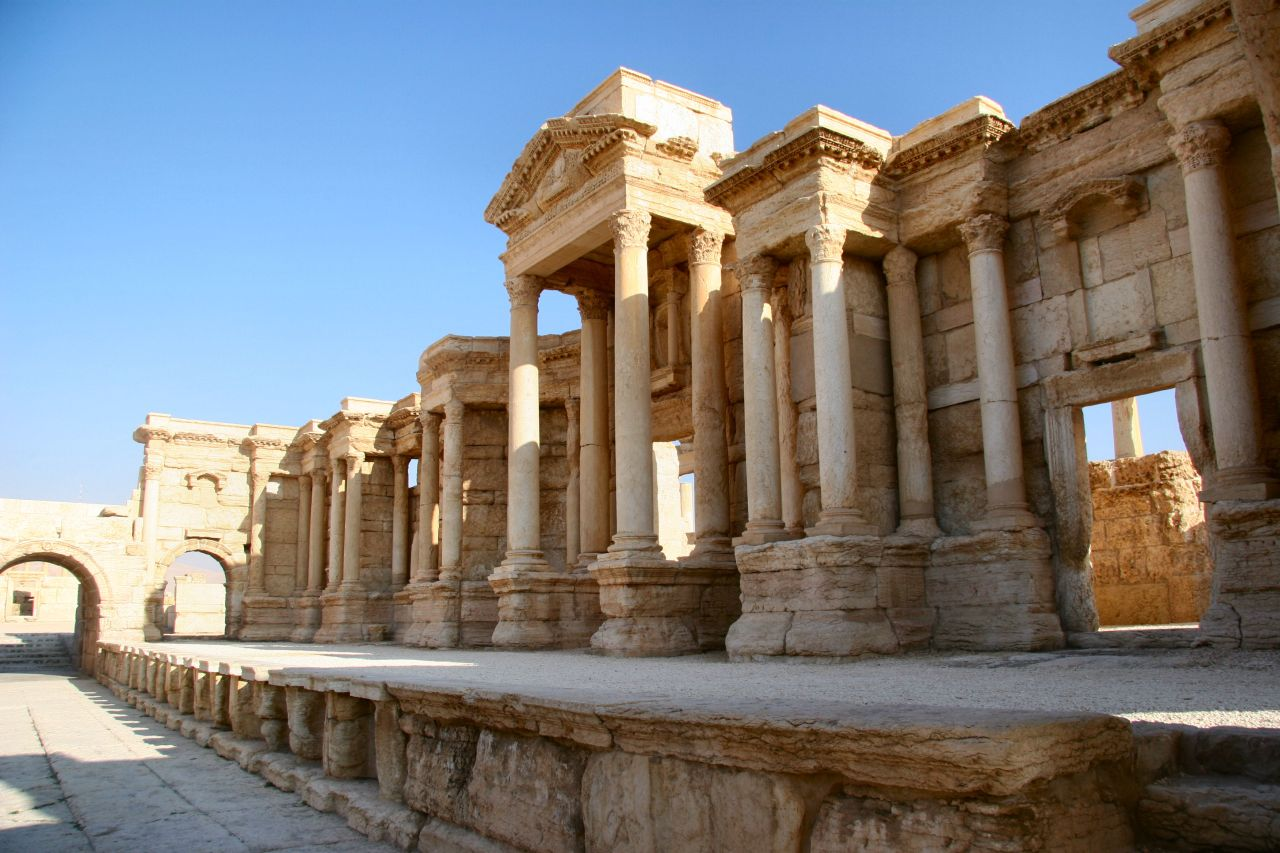
Scene of the Roman Theatre at Palmyra, 2005.

Byzantine Syria was conquered by the Muslim Arab forces of the Medina-based Rashidun Caliphate in 634–638 CE. It was one of the main theaters of the wider early Muslim conquests and the beginning of the Arab–Byzantine wars.

Clashes between the Muslims and the Byzantines on the southern Syrian frontier of the Byzantine Empire had occurred during the lifetime of Muhammad, with the Battle of Mu'ta in 629. The actual conquest did not begin until c. 634, about two years after Muhammad's death, and was undertaken during the reigns of the first two caliphs: Abu Bakr and Umar. Overall command of the Muslim army was held by Khalid ibn al-Walid (634–636) then Abu Ubayda ibn al-Jarrah (636–639). While most of Syria was conquered by 638, areas of northern Syria and several coastal cities were not fully conquered until the early 640s. Syria became the province of al-Sham, one of the principal regions of the nascent Islamic empire and afterward, the metropolitan region of the Umayyad Caliphate (661–750).

== Background ==
=== Byzantine Syria ===
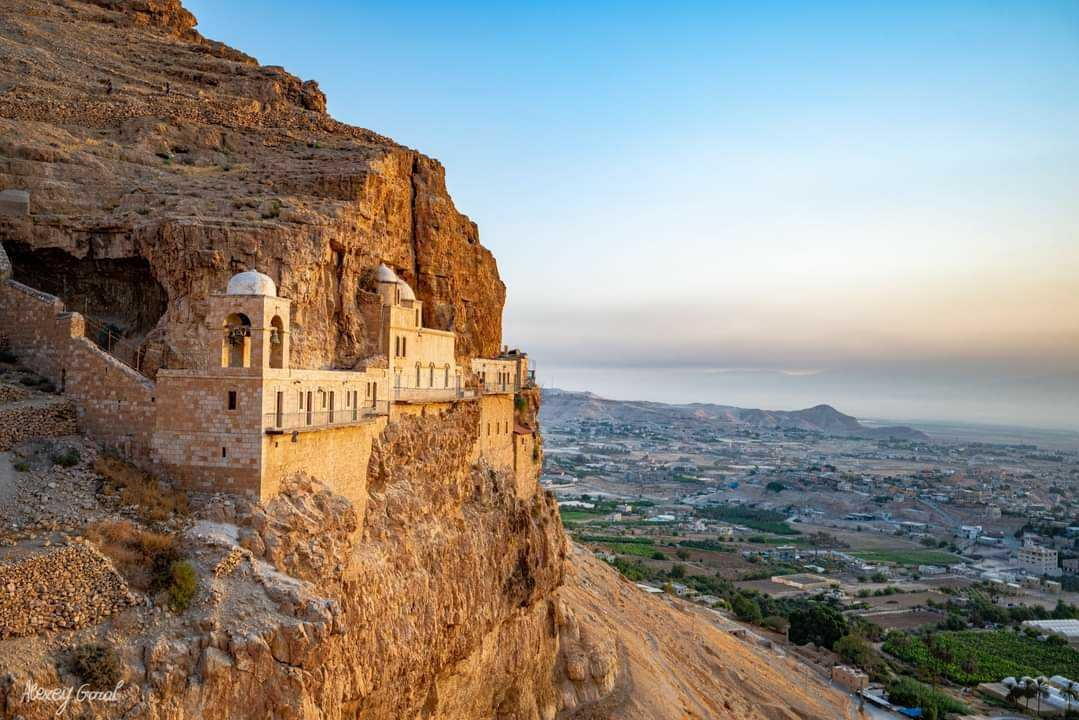
The Monastery of the Temptation, built by the Byzantines in the 6th century over the cave where Jesus spent forty days fasting.

Syria had been under Roman rule for seven centuries prior to the Arab Muslim conquest and had been invaded by the Persian Sasanian Empire on a number of occasions during the 3rd, 6th and 7th centuries; it had also been subject to raids by the Sasanian Empire' Arab allies, the Lakhmids. During the Roman period, beginning after the Siege of Jerusalem in the year 70, the Levant (Judea, Samaria, and the Galilee) was renamed Palaestina, subdivided into Diocese I and II. The Romans also renamed an area of land including the Negev, Sinai, and the west coast of the Arabian Peninsula as Palaestina Salutaris, sometimes called Palaestina III or Palaestina Tertia. Part of the area was ruled by the Arab vassal state of the Ghassanids' symmachos.

During the last of the Roman-Persian Wars, beginning in 602, the Persians under Khosrau II had succeeded in occupying Syria, Palestine and Egypt for over a decade before being forced by the victories of Heraclius to conclude the peace of 628. Thus, on the eve of the Muslim conquests the Romans (or Byzantines as modern Western historians conventionally refer to Romans of this period) were still in the process of rebuilding their authority in these territories, which in some areas had been lost to them for almost twenty years. Politically, the Syrian region consisted of two provinces: Syria proper stretched from Antioch and Aleppo in the north to the top of the Dead Sea. To the west and south of the Dead Sea lay the province of Palestine.

Byzantine Syria was mostly home to Aramaic and Greek speakers and a partly Arab population, especially in its eastern and southern parts. The Ghassanid tribe, who migrated from Yemen to Syria, converted to Christianity and served as foederati for the Eastern Roman empire like the Tanukh before them. Thereafter, they ruled a semi-autonomous state with their own king under Roman vassalage. The Ghassanid dynasty became one of the honoured princely dynasties of the Empire, with the Ghassanid king ruling over the Arabs in Jordan and Southern Syria from his capital at Bostra. The last of the Ghassanid kings, who ruled at the time of the Muslim invasion, was Jabala ibn al-Ayham.

The Byzantine Emperor Heraclius, after re-capturing Syria from the Sassanians, set up new defense lines from Gaza to the south end of the Dead Sea. These lines were only designed to protect communications from bandits, and the bulk of the Byzantine defenses were concentrated in Northern Syria facing the traditional foes, the Sassanid Persians. The drawback of this defense line was that it enabled the Muslims, advancing from the desert in the south, to reach as far north as Gaza before meeting regular Byzantine troops.

The 7th century was a time of rapid military change in the Byzantine Empire. The empire was certainly not in a state of collapse when it faced the new challenge from Arabia after being exhausted by recent Roman–Persian Wars, but utterly failed to tackle the challenge effectively.

=== Rise of the Caliphate ===
Military confrontations with the Byzantine Empire began during the lifetime of Muhammad. The Battle of Mu'tah was fought in September 629 near the village of Mu'tah, east of the Jordan River and Karak in Karak Governorate, between the forces of the Islamic prophet Muhammad and the forces of the Byzantine Empire and their Arab Christian Ghassanid vassals. In Islamic historical sources, the battle is usually described as the Muslims' attempt to take retribution against the Ghassanids after a Ghassanid official executed Muhammad's emissary who was en route to Bosra. During the battle the Muslim army was routed. After three Muslim leaders were killed, the command was given to Khalid ibn al-Walid and he succeeded in saving the rest of the forces. The surviving Muslim forces retreated to Medina.

After the Farewell Pilgrimage in 632, Muhammad appointed Usama ibn Zayd as the commander of an expeditionary force which was to invade the region of Balqa in the Byzantine Empire. This expedition was known as the Expedition of Usama bin Zayd and its stated aim was to avenge the Muslim losses at the Battle of Mu'tah, in which Usama's father and Muhammad's former adopted son, Zayd ibn Harithah, had been killed. Usama's expedition in May/June 632 was successful and his army was the first Muslim force to successfully invade and raid Byzantine territory.

Muhammad died in June 632, and Abu Bakr was appointed Caliph and political successor at Medina. Soon after Abu Bakr's succession, several Arab tribes revolted against him in the Ridda wars (Arabic for the Wars of Apostasy). The Campaign of the Apostasy was fought and completed during the eleventh year of the Hijri. The year 12 Hijri dawned, on 18 March 633, with Arabia united under the central authority of the Caliph at Medina.

Whether Abu Bakr intended a full-out imperial conquest or not is hard to say; he did, however, set in motion a historical trajectory that in just a few short decades would lead to one of the largest empires in history, starting with a confrontation with the Persian Empire under the general Khalid ibn al-Walid.

== Historiography ==
Despite the often contradictory early Islamic narratives of the conquest, the historian Fred Donner deemed it "possible to reconstruct the broad outlines" of the war. The course of the conquest is generally divided into three main phases. During the initial invasion in late 633–early 634, Muslim forces encountered local garrisons and conquered much of the southern, tribal Syrian countryside. The second phase in 634–636 saw the arrival of the prominent Arab general Khalid ibn al-Walid and the capture of major towns, eliciting increasingly stronger responses by the Byzantine emperor. In the ensuing major battles, the Byzantine imperial armies were decisively defeated. This breaking of imperial power in the region brought about the final phase, the occupation of Syria, from 637 to 647–648. This stage, in Donner's words, entailed "the rapid conquest of the remaining countryside not under the Muslims' control, especially in northern Syria, and the piecemeal reduction of individual Syrian towns, which had been left alone to resist the advancing Muslims".

According to the narrative of the 8th-century historian al-Azdi, Abu Bakr instructed Yazid with ethical and operational instructions:

When you meet the enemy, and God leads you to victory, do not manacle, mutilate, maim, or betray, and do not accuse [the defeated] of cowardice. Do not, you all, kill children, old men, or women; do not burn palm trees or uproot them; do not cut down fruitful trees; and do not slaughter cattle except for eating [them]. You will pass by people in their hermitages who claim to have secluded themselves for [worshipping] God; leave them to what they have secluded themselves for. You will also find others in the middle of whose heads Satan has taken up abode, as if the middles of their heads were the sandgrouse's nests (afahīs al-qatā). Strike the nests which they have hollowed in their heads with swords until they turn repentantly to Islam, or until they bring tribute by hand and with humility. God will certainly support those who support Him and His Messengers in absentia (bi-al-ghayb).

The authenticity of these instructions has been questioned by modern scholars. James Moreton Wackeley characterises it as a literary construct intended to idealise early Muslim leadership, while Albrecht Noth interprets such speeches as part of a wider tradition in which later transmitters reworked existing material to promote moral and legal norms, retroactively ascribing it to prominent early figures to strengthen its authority. Such interpretations are situated within a broader secular academic discourse that applies historical-critical methods to the Islamic tradition.

A Syriac apocolyptic sermon, generally dated by modern scholars to c. 640, portrays the conquering Arabs as raiders, though Robert Hoyland theorizes it may refer to plundering by the Arabs in Syria during the reign of Umayyad caliph Abd al-Malik: "They take the wife away from her husband and slay him like a sheep. They throw the babe from her mother and drive her into slavery; the child calls out from the ground and the mother hears, yet what is she to do?...They separate the children from the mother like the soul from within the body, and she watches as they divide her loved ones from off her lap, two of them go to two owners, herself to another ... Her children cry out in lament, their eyes hot with tears. She turns to her loved ones, milk pouring forth from her breast: "Go in peace, my darlings, and may God accompany you."

== Initial invasion ==
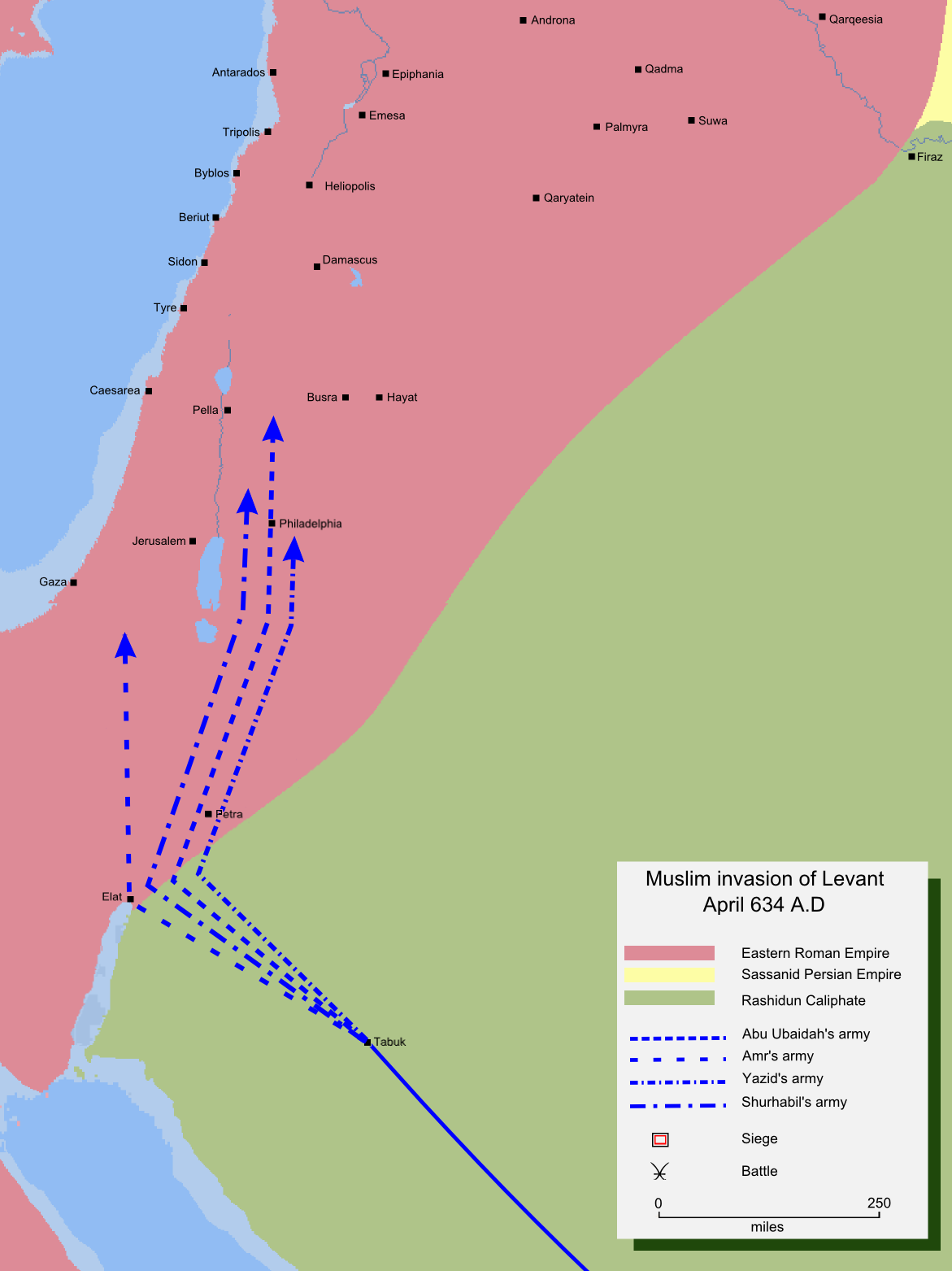
Map detailing Rashidun Caliphate's invasion of the Levant.

With the tribes of Arabia brought under Medina's control during the Ridda wars, Abu Bakr prepared and dispatched armies for the conquest of Byzantine Syria. The first of these armies was probably that of Khalid ibn Sa'id ibn al-As, an early companion of Muhammad. He was shortly after dismissed at the instigation of Umar for having opposed Abu Bakr's succession, with one set of early Muslim accounts placing this dismissal before his departure from Medina and the other once he reached the Tayma oasis on the approaches to Syria. At Tayma, he was supposedly reinforced with troops led by the commander al-Walid ibn Uqba, engaged with Arab allies of the Byzantines, and was eventually defeated.

In the Islamic calendar date of Rajab 12 AH (September 633) or the beginning of 13 AH (Spring 634), (Note: According to the historian Fred Donner, the traditional sources' dating of the first Muslim armies' deployment to Syria was behind by several months. It most likely occurred in the autumn of 633, which better conforms with the anonymous Syriac Chronicle of 724, which dates the first clash between the Muslim armies and the Byzantines to February 634.) Abu Bakr dispatched three or four armies to Syria led respectively by Amr ibn al-As, Shurahbil ibn Hasana, Yazid ibn Abi Sufyan, and Abu Ubayda ibn al-Jarrah, all of whom were companions of Muhammad and the first two veterans of the Ridda wars. The timing and order of each commander's deployment and whether they were independent of each other or if any held the high command at this stage is not clear. Each army took a separate route toward Syria. Amr embarked on the coastal road to Ayla before breaking northwest into the Negev Desert and toward Gaza. The other commanders took the road through Tabuk, with Shurahbil stopping in the area east of the Arabah Valley, Yazid terminating in the Balqa region east of the Dead Sea, and Abu Ubayda taking up position in the Golan Heights area. The 9th-century historian al-Baladhuri and modern scholarship in general dates Abu Ubayda's arrival in Syria to after Abu Bakr's death in 634 and as late as 636.

The first encounter between the Muslims and Byzantines occurred at Dathin and Badan, near Gaza, where negotiations between Amr and the local Byzantine garrison commander broke down and gave way to a skirmish ending with Amr's defeat of the local garrison. While of minor consequence, news of the Arabs' victory at Dathin alerted the Byzantines to the entry of Muslim forces into Syria. Amr afterward set up headquarters at Ghamr al-Arabat, a location in the middle of the Arabah Valley. Credible details of the other commanders' activities is sparse, but a lieutenant of Abu Ubayda may have gained the surrender of a town called Ma'ab in the Balqa, Yazid may have succeeded against a Byzantine force in a minor clash in Palestine and Shurahbil oversaw activity against the pro-Byzantine Quda'a tribal group in his area of operations.

Donner concludes that the operations in this phase of the Muslim campaigns, where urban centers and major agricultural areas were avoided, targeted the territories inhabited by nomadic and partly settled Arab tribes. Kennedy comments that at this point, "the Muslim attacks on Syria had amounted to little more than pinpricks along the frontiers". The goal of the Muslim state was probably to continue the process of subjugating all Arab tribes, which Medina had consistently viewed as posing threats to its power. Once the bulk of the tribes were under Muslim control, the Muslims could launch the major assaults against Syria's main armies and cities.

== Byzantine movements ==
=== Battles of Ajnadayn and Fahl ===
In the spring of 634, the prominent veteran commander of the Ridda wars Khalid ibn al-Walid was directed by Abu Bakr to leave his campaigning in the desert frontier of Iraq and join the Muslim armies in Syria. He embarked on an unconventional march across the Syrian Desert, including six days through a waterless trek. He managed the trek by increasing his camels' water intake, sealing their mouths to prevent them from eating, and slaughtering them for water as needed by his troops. He bested pro-Byzantine Arabs from the Bahra tribe in the vicinity of Palmyra. Afterward, on 24 April 634, he landed upon a group of pro-Byzantine Ghassanid Arabs celebrating Easter at the Marj Rahit meadow north of Damascus. His troops proceeded to raid the Ghouta gardens around the city. They then rendezvoused with Muslim forces positioned near Bosra, the capital of Arabia Province and a center of trade in the Hauran region south of Damascus which historically provided the nomadic Arabs with oil, wine and grain. Khalid was appointed to the supreme command of the Muslim armies in Syria by Abu Bakr or by the Muslim commanders already present.

The Muslims besieged and captured Bosra in May, facing token resistance by its defenders. The city surrendered in a pact obliging its inhabitants to pay an annual poll tax, the jizya. Khalid and the other commanders moved to join Amr ibn al-As in southern Palestine to help him counter a large number of Byzantine troops mobilized against him. The ensuing Battle of Ajnadayn, fought at a site in the Wadi al-Simt valley southwest of Jerusalem, was the first major confrontation between the Muslims and the Byzantines. The two sides incurred significant losses, including several prominent Muslims and the Byzantine cubicularius, but the battle ended with the Byzantines routed. The battle is variously dated to July 634 or January 635. In the aftermath of Ajnadayn, Amr captured several towns in the interior of Palestine, including Sebastia, Nablus (Neapolis), Lydda, Yibna, Amwas (Emmaus-Nicopolis), Bayt Jibrin (Eleutheropolis) and Jaffa. Most of these towns fell after minor resistance, hence the scant information available about their captures in the sources.

Remnants of the Byzantines from Ajnadayn regrouped to the northeast, in Pella ('Fahl' in Arabic), a town with a Byzantine garrison on the eastern bank of the River Jordan, across from Scythopolis ('Beisan' in Arabic). The Muslims pursued them there, encountering difficulty traversing the muddy grounds around Beisan with their horses, a result of floods from the breaking of the river banks by the Byzantines. The Muslims defeated the Byzantines, who incurred heavy casualties, at the Battle of Fahl and occupied the city in December 634 or January 635. They may have engaged with Byzantine troops in another battle at Marj al-Suffar, south of Damascus, in which the Muslims suffered heavy losses but drove the Byzantines off nonetheless. Marj al-Suffar is dated variously to March 635 or before Fahl, in July 634.

=== Siege of Damascus ===
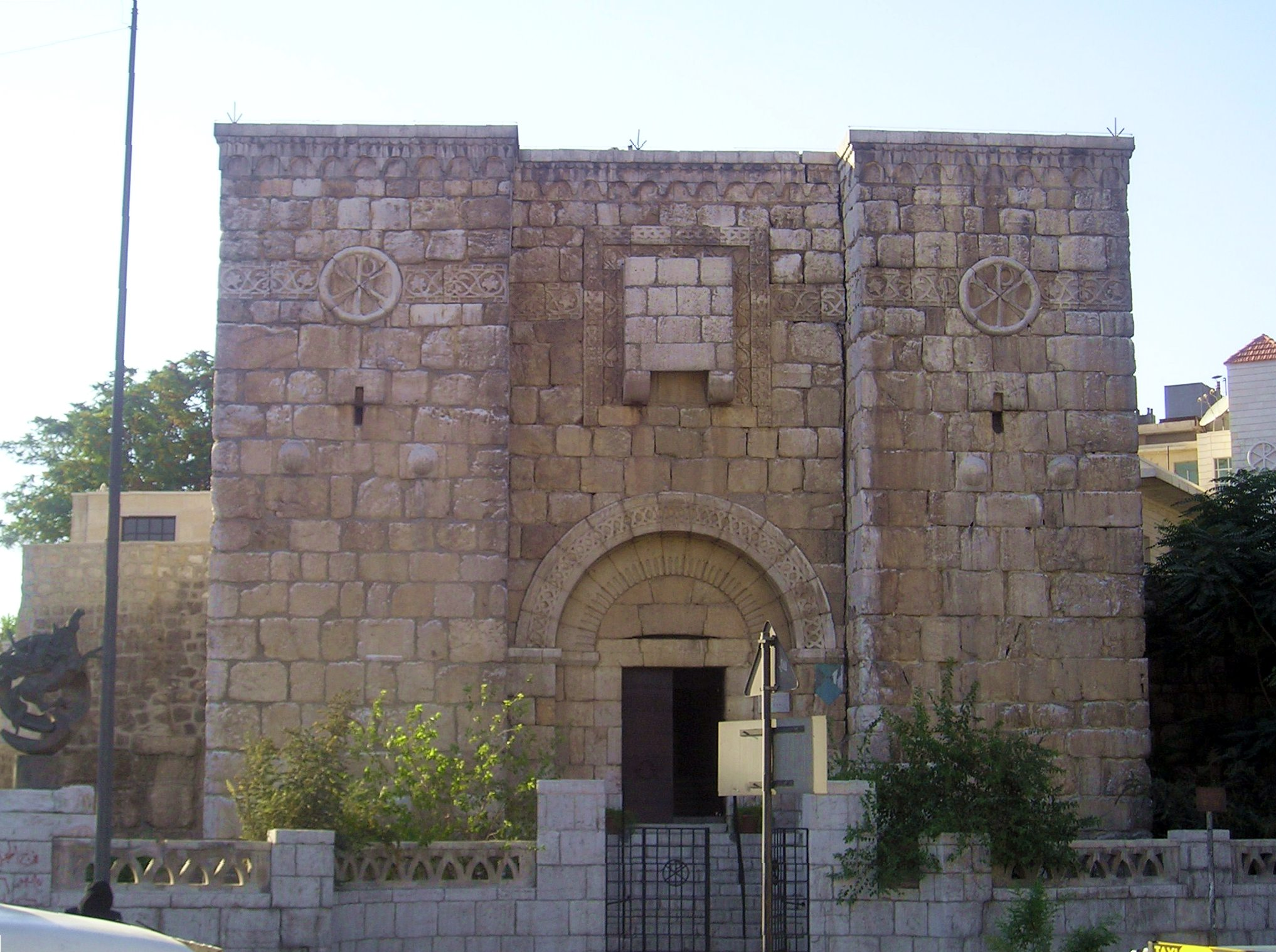
The Kaysan Gate, one of six gates of Damascus besieged by the commanders of the Muslim armies in Syria

From Fahl, the Muslims marched on Damascus, where the Byzantines there were joined by their fellow comrades from the previous battles with the Muslims. They were under the command of Vahan. All of the Muslim commanders participated in the siege of Damascus, each posted to one of the city's five gates, while a sixth unit was positioned at the village of Barzeh to intercept Byzantine reinforcements from the north. Following a lengthy siege, Damascus capitulated in August or September 635. Although historical accounts disagree in the identities of the commanders, most of the Muslim accounts agree that Muslim forces breached one of the city's gates, while on another side of the city, the local leaders opened a gate after negotiations with a different Muslim unit. The Muslim commanders ultimately met in the city center where they came to draft a capitulation agreement with the inhabitants of the city.

Although several versions of the treaty were recorded in the early Muslim and Christian sources, (Note: Most of the Muslim accounts are traced to the prominent 8th-century jurist of Syria, al-Awza'i, and among the Muslim historians, the Damascus-based Ibn Asakir devotes the most attention to it, recording six versions of the text. The earliest Christian accounts of the treaty were recorded by the Syriac author Dionysius of Tel Mahre and the Melkite patriarch Eutychius of Alexandria.) they generally concur that the inhabitants' lives, properties and churches were to be safeguarded, in return for their payment of the jizya (poll tax). Imperial properties were confiscated by the Muslims. The treaty most likely served as the model for the capitulation agreements made throughout Syria, as well as Iraq and Egypt, during the early Muslim conquests. (Note: The Muslim forces entered similar agreements with nearly all the cities they besieged in Syria, including Tiberias, Beisan, Homs, Aleppo, Jerusalem, as well as Alexandria in Egypt and the cities of Upper Mesopotamia.)

=== Battle of the Yarmuk ===
After Damascus, Muslim forces proceeded to capture Baalbek and then, after a months-long siege, occupied Homs in December 635 or January 636. Heraclius, who had been observing events from his base in Antioch, responded to the string of Muslim victories and occupations of major cities by mobilizing a massive force of Byzantine imperial troops, local garrisons from Antioch, Aleppo, Chalcis, Mesopotamia, Armenians under their commander Gregory, and Syrian Arab tribesmen under the Ghassanid chief Jabala ibn Ayham. The overall command of the Byzantines was held by the sacellarius and Vahan. This force's march south prompted the Muslims to abandon Homs, Baalbek and Damascus and regroup at Jabiya in the Golan Heights. The Byzantines took up position nearby, along the Ruqqad river, prompting the Muslims to set up camp at the adjoining Yarmuk River. This hilly area straddled the borders of four Byzantine provinces and served as the main pasture grounds for the Ghassanids.

Muslim and Byzantine troop movements before the battle of the Yarmuk

As the Byzantines advanced, the Muslims feigned retreat, inducing the Byzantines to assault the Muslims' camp at Dayr Ayyub. This left the Byzantines' left flank vulnerable and Muslim forces used the wide gap and poor coordination between the Byzantine cavalry and infantry to inflict heavy casualties on the latter. Byzantine forces subsequently fled for safety to a site between the Ruqqad and Allan streams, but the site's only viable exit, the bridge over the Ruqqad, was captured in a night raid by Khalid's cavalry. The Muslims afterward assaulted the Byzantines' encampments between the two streams and at the village of Yaqusa on the edge of the Golan, where most of the Byzantine troops were slain, though many Arab Christian auxiliaries had deserted by that point.

The Muslim victory at the Yarmuk destroyed the main Byzantine army in Syria and ended the Byzantines' will to confront the Muslims on the field. It sealed Muslim gains in Palestine and Transjordan and paved the way to their quick reoccupation of Damascus and the Beqaa Valley. In the assessment of historian John Jandora, Yarmuk was one of "the most important battles of World History", ultimately leading to Muslim victories which expanded the Caliphate between the Pyrenees mountains and Central Asia.

== Occupation of Syria ==
As the Muslims no longer had to confront Byzantine standing armies after Yarmuk, the Muslim army in Syria split into smaller forces and proceeded to occupy Syria's cities. In this phase of the conquest, the main resistance against the Muslims were Byzantine garrisons and local militias.

=== Conquest of the north ===
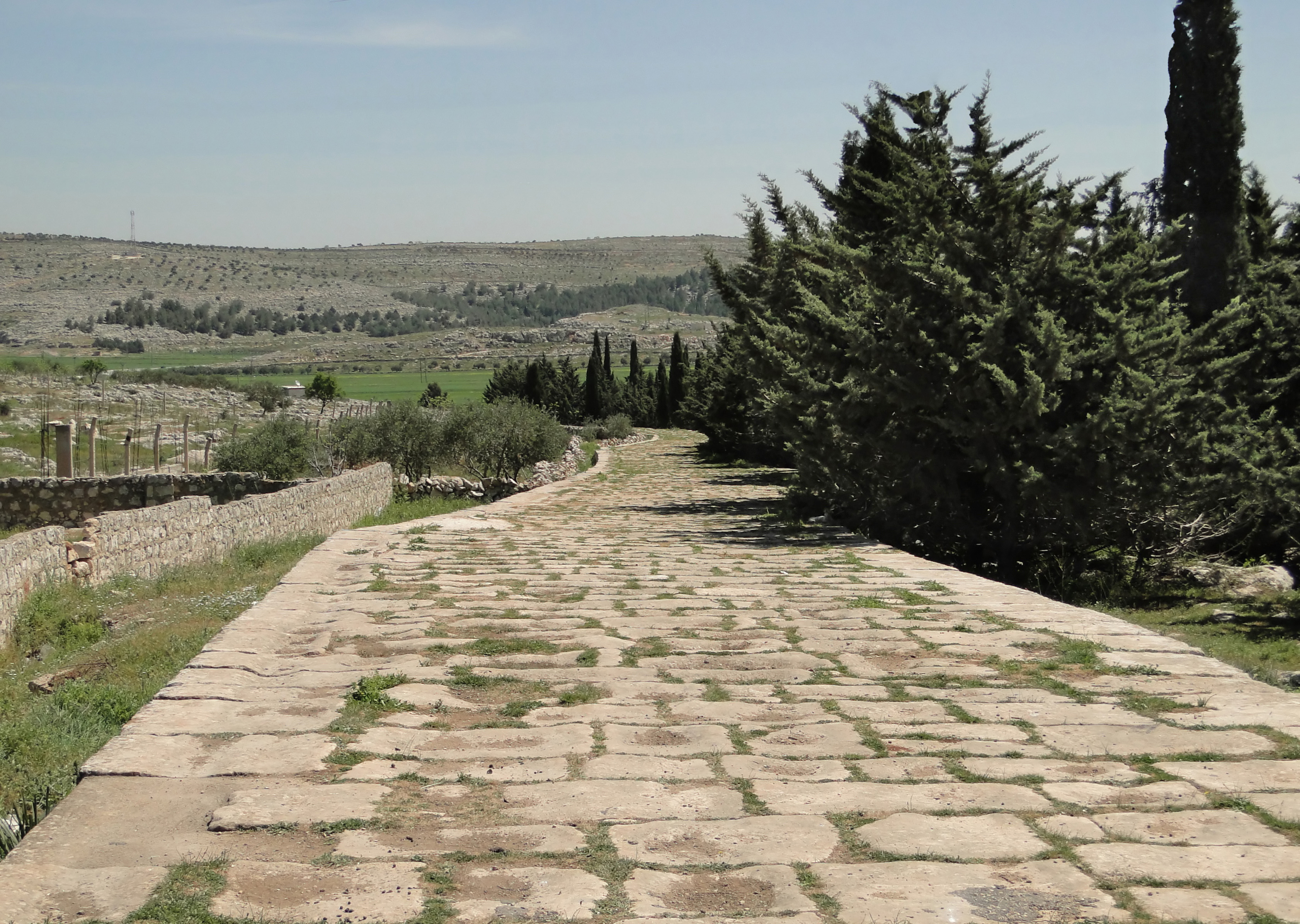
The Roman road between the northern Syrian cities of Antioch and Qinnasrin, which the Muslims captured in c. 637

Probably after Yarmuk, Khalid was replaced by Abu Ubayda as the overall commander of the Muslim forces in Syria, with Khalid becoming one of his lieutenant commanders. Abu Ubayda and his lieutenants besieged and recaptured Homs, making it the base of operations for the conquest of northern Syria. Abu Ubayda and/or his lieutenants proceeded to capture Qinnasrin (Chalcis), Aleppo and Antioch from their defenders in relatively quick succession.

The accounts about events in northern Syria are especially divergent. Heraclius may have deployed a force under a general, Minas, which was defeated by the Muslims in the plain between Aleppo and Qinnasrin, before or after the Muslims' capture of those cities. A Byzantine army, swelled by conscripts from several cities in Upper Mesopotamia (the 'Jazira' in Arabic), may have besieged Homs, prompting Abu Ubayda to recall his lieutenants and their armies in the north to buttress the defense of the city. As other Muslim forces proceeded east against the cities of the Jazira, the troops from those areas abandoned the siege to defend their hometowns. Khalid then bested the remaining besiegers.

The Muslims then suppressed rebellions in Antioch and Qinnasrin. As northern Syria, including the area east toward the Euphrates, was conquered, Heraclius abandoned his base in Edessa for Samosata and eventually Constantinople. During his withdrawal to the capital, Heraclius disbanded the garrisons, which largely consisted of local farmers, and forts in the mountainous region between Tarsus and Alexandretta so that incoming Muslim troops encountered a deserted countryside.

=== Siege of Jerusalem ===
Abu Ubayda, while still retaining the command of Muslim troops in the north, may have played a less active role in operations there as he left to lead the siege of Jerusalem in late 636 or early 637. One reconstruction of the Islamic tradition holds that an advance force was sent against the city by Amr following the Battle of Ajnadayn. A sermon by Patriarch Sophronius of Jerusalem in Christmas 634 indicated that Jerusalem's environs, including Bethlehem, had already been in Muslim hands by then.

The siege of Jerusalem was overseen by Abu Ubayda and several of the top Muslim commanders played a role. It lasted for months, as Sophronius refused to capitulate except to the caliph Umar. The latter visited the troops at their main camp at Jabiya at least once, around 637. From there, he negotiated with Jerusalem's representatives the city's capitulation. The agreement guaranteed the safety of Jerusalem's Christian inhabitants and their property and churches, and allowed them freedom of worship in return for the jizya. Byzantine troops and other residents seeking to evacuate were given safe passage until reaching their point of departure from Palestine. The historian Moshe Gil assessed that Umar adopted a lenient approach so the inhabitants could be in an economic position to subsidize the Arab tribesmen garrisoned in Palestine.

An Arabic inscription dated to 652 discovered in Jerusalem mentions Abu Ubayda and Abd al-Rahman ibn Awf as witnesses in relation to Jerusalem's capitulation. The inscription was written by the then governor of Syria and katib (scribe), Mu'awiya ibn Abi Sufyan. Both Mu'awiya and Abd al-Rahman are mentioned as witnesses to the treaty by al-Tabari and Abu Ubayda is described in the Islamic sources as playing the key role in its negotiation; the historian Moshe Sharon thus proposes it was a legal document commemorating the capitulation.

=== Fall of coastal holdouts ===
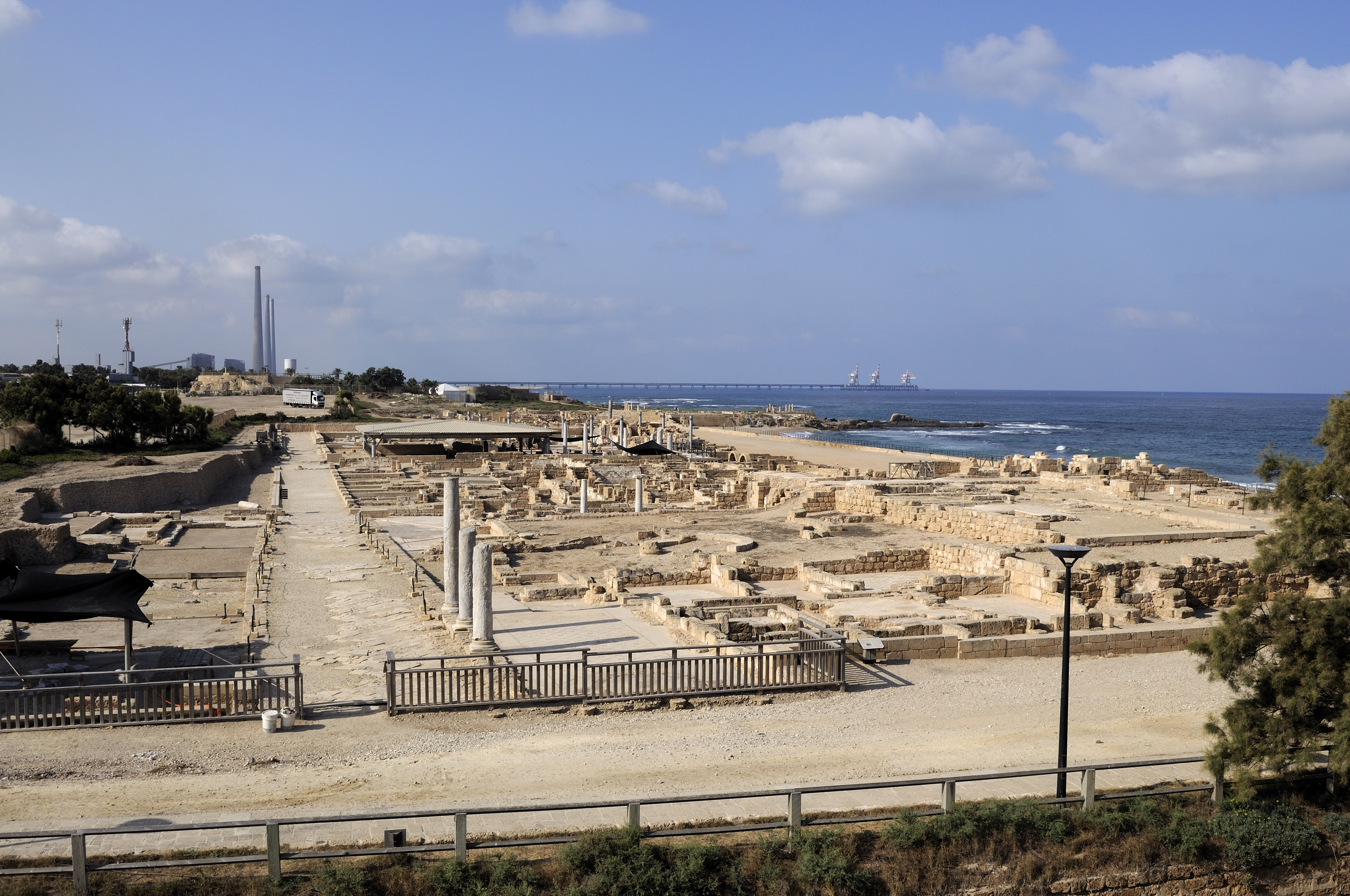
Ruins of Caesarea Maritima, capital of Byzantine Palestine and one of the last cities in Syria to fall to the Muslims

The coastlands of Syria, especially northern Syria and the Phoenician coast, were the last areas to submit to the Muslims. The port cities were captured by different armies and withstood sieges for longer due to the Byzantines' domination of the sea. The besieged garrisons were thus easily reinforced and resupplied, while cities captured by the Muslims were subject to Byzantine naval raids.

On Palestine's coast, Yazid ibn Abi Sufyan's brother Mu'awiya led the years-long sieges of Caesarea and Asqalan, which surrendered between 639 and 641. Yazid and Mu'awiya also led the sieges and captures of Sidon, Beirut, and Byblos. A lieutenant of Abu Ubayda, Ubada ibn al-Samit, led the raids that captured Tartus and Latakia. One of the last coastal cities to fall was Tripoli (modern-day northern Lebanon), which was captured during Caliph Uthman's reign in 644. With the exception of Caesarea, the coastal cities were relatively minor operations by smaller detachments under lower-ranking commanders. Following the fall of Caesarea in 640, 4,000 captives were sent to Medina, where they were distributed as war booty to the orphans of the Ansar. Since Arabia lacked many people who could read and write, Umar kept several literate boys from the Caesarea slaves for use as secretaries within the newly established state apparatus.

== Plague of Amwas ==
In 638 and/or 639, the plague of Amwas had broken out in Syria, subsiding in October 639. The plague took a heavy toll on the Muslim army in Syria and its commanders. Abu Ubayda moved to encamp the army from its principal headquarters in Amwas in Palestine to the old Ghassanid seat of Jabiya in the Hauran highlands. Due to its healthy climate, Jabiya effectively acted as a sanatorium for plague-stricken troops and the center for the distribution of war spoils. Before reaching Jabiya, Abu Ubayda succumbed to the plague, followed soon after by his successor Mu'adh ibn Jabal, and Mu'adh's successor Yazid ibn Abi Sufyan. One of the other chief commanders in Syria, Shurahbil, also died from the plague, along with lesser commanders Suhayl ibn Amr, Suhayl's son Abu Jandal, al-Fadl ibn Abbas and al-Harith ibn Hisham. Amr ibn al-As led the surviving troops to Jabiya, and in December 639, unilaterally embarked on the conquest of Byzantine Egypt.

The Islamic tradition maintains between 20,000 and 25,000 Muslim soldiers in Syria and their family members died in the plague. By 639, 4,000 soldiers were left in Jabiya out of some 24,000 in 637, though Donner notes it is unclear how many of the missing troops had died or had temporarily fled and returned to Syria eventually. The plague also caused substantial loss of life among the Christian population in Syria. During a purported visit to Syria by Umar in 639, he gave directions on the disposition of the estates of the Muslims who died in the epidemic and settled suspicious claims by some of the troops. With the loss of his top commanders in Syria, Umar split the command, appointing Yazid's brother and deputy, Mu'awiya, (Note: The historian Wilferd Madelung surmises that the plague had precluded Umar from deploying commanders more preferable to him from Medina and he thus appointed Mu'awiya in lieu of a suitable alternative.) over the ajnad ('armies'; sing. jund) of Damascus and Jordan and the veteran commander Iyad ibn Ghanm over the jund of Homs, whose jurisdiction also spanned northern Syria (Qinnasrin) and the Jazira. (Note: The jund of Palestine had been split between Amr ibn al-As and Alqama ibn Mujazziz al-Kinani before ending solely with the latter when Amr ibn al-As embarked on the conquest of Egypt.)

The losses among the Muslim troops in Syria from the plague contributed to Mu'awiya's heavy military reliance on the older-established, formerly Byzantine-allied and Christian Arab tribes in Syria, particularly the Banu Kalb, who had largely stayed neutral during the fighting between the Muslims and the Byzantines. According to the historian Khalil Athamina, Medina's lack of a regular standing army, the need to redeploy fighters to other fronts, and the Byzantine threat to Muslim gains in Syria all required the establishment of a defense structure based on these older-established Arab tribes, which had historically served as confederates of Byzantium. After Medina's entreaties to the leading confederates, the Ghassanids, were rebuffed, relations were established with the Kalb, Judham and Lakhm, the former dominant in central Syria and the latter based in southern Transjordan and Palestine. These tribes probably considered the large numbers of foreign Arab tribesmen in the Muslim army, particularly those under Khalid's command, as a threat to their political and economic power. (Note: The commander Khalid ibn al-Walid's initial force of 500–800 men had swelled to as high as 10,000 as a result of tribesmen joining his army's ranks from the Iraqi front or Arabia and as high as 30,000–40,000 factoring in their families.) Athamina attributes Umar's earlier demotion of Khalid in 636 and the redeployment of his troops soon after to the Sasanian front in Iraq as an overture to the Kalb and their tribal allies.

== Conquest of Byzantine Upper Mesopotamia ==
A map of the Jazira region (Upper Mesopotamia) in the 8th century

When Iyad was appointed over Homs, Umar gave him instructions to conquer the Jazira from its Byzantine commanders because they had refused to pay the tributes promised to the Muslims in 638. By the time Iyad was given his assignment, Syria proper had been largely conquered, leaving the Byzantine garrisons in the Jazira isolated from the empire. In August 639, Iyad led a 5,000-strong army toward Raqqa (Kallinikos) in the Jazira and raided the city's environs. He encountered resistance from its defenders, prompting him to withdraw and send smaller units to raid around Raqqa, seizing captives and harvests. After five or six days of these raids, Raqqa's patrician negotiated the surrender of the city to Iyad. According to the historian Michael Meinecke, Iyad captured the city in 639 or 640.

After Raqqa, Iyad proceeded toward Harran, where his progress was stalled. He diverted part of his army to Edessa, which capitulated after negotiations. Iyad then received Harran's surrender and dispatched Safwan ibn Mu'attal al-Sulami and his own kinsman Habib ibn Maslama al-Fihri to seize Samosata, which also ended in a negotiated surrender after Muslim raiding of its countryside. By 640, Iyad had successively conquered Saruj, Jisr Manbij and Tell Mawzin. Before the capture of Tell Mawzin, Iyad attempted to take Ras al-Ayn, but retreated after stiff resistance. Later, he dispatched Umayr ibn Sa'd al-Ansari to take the city. Umayr first assaulted the rural peasantry and seized cattle in the town's vicinity. The inhabitants barricaded inside the walled city and inflicted heavy losses on the Muslim forces, before capitulating. About the same time, Iyad besieged Samosata in response to a rebellion, the nature of which is not specified by al-Baladhuri, and stationed a small garrison in Edessa after the city's inhabitants violated their terms of surrender.

After Samosata, al-Baladhuri, who gives a detailed but triumphalist account of the Mesopotamian campaign, maintains that Iyad subdued a string of villages "on the same terms" as Edessa's surrender. Between the end of 639 and December 640, Iyad and his lieutenants subdued, in succession, Circesium (al-Qarqisiya), Amid, Mayyafariqin, Nisibin, Tur Abdin, Mardin, Dara, Qarda and Bazabda. With the exception of Nisibin, which put up resistance, all these cities and fortresses fell to the Muslims after negotiated surrenders. In contrast to al-Baladhuri's passive account of Iyad's capture of Dara, the 10th-century historian Agapius of Hierapolis wrote that many were slain on both sides, particularly among the Muslims, and the city fell after a negotiated surrender. Iyad continued toward Arzanene, then to Bitlis and finally to Khilat; all three cities surrendered after negotiations with their patricians. Shortly after, Iyad left for Raqqa. On the way, one medieval Muslim report holds that Iyad dispatched a force to capture Sinjar, after which he settled it with Arabs.

According to 9th-century scholar Ibn Sa'd, "not a foot was left of Mesopotamia unsubdued by Iyad ibn Ghanm", and Iyad "effected the conquest of Mesopotamia and its towns by capitulation, but its land by force". The tactics used in the Mesopotamian campaign were similar to those employed by the Muslims in Palestine, though in Iyad's case the contemporary accounts reveal his specific modus operandi, particularly in Raqqa. The operation to capture that city entailed positioning cavalry forces near its entrances, preventing its defenders and residents from leaving or rural refugees from entering. Concurrently, the remainder of Iyad's forces cleared the surrounding countryside of supplies and took captives. These dual tactics were employed in several other cities in the Jazira. They proved effective in gaining surrenders from targeted cities running low on supplies and whose satellite villages were trapped by hostile troops. Iyad's overall goal was to conquer the Jazira with minimal damage to ensure the flow of revenue to the caliphate. In the agreements he reached with the patricians of Raqqa, Edessa, Harran and Samosata, payments came in various forms, including cash, wheat, oil, vinegar, honey, labor services to maintain roads and bridges, and guides and intelligence for the Muslim newcomers.

Iyad's settlements with Mesopotamia's cities "to a large extent left most of local society untouched". In the view of Petersen, Iyad's campaign partially diverted the Byzantines' attention away from the Muslims' central offensive against Syria's port cities and the province of Egypt, while also "demonstrating to the Armenian nobility that the Caliphate had become a viable alternative to the Persian Empire". After Iyad's death in 641, he was succeeded by Sa'id ibn Hidhyam al-Jumahi, but the latter died soon after and Umayr ibn Sa'd al-Ansari, one of Iyad's lieutenants, was appointed in his place by Umar. In late 646 or early 647, Umar's successor, Caliph Uthman, gave command over the jund of Homs–Jazira to Mu'awiya, making him governor of the entire Syrian region.

== Aftermath ==
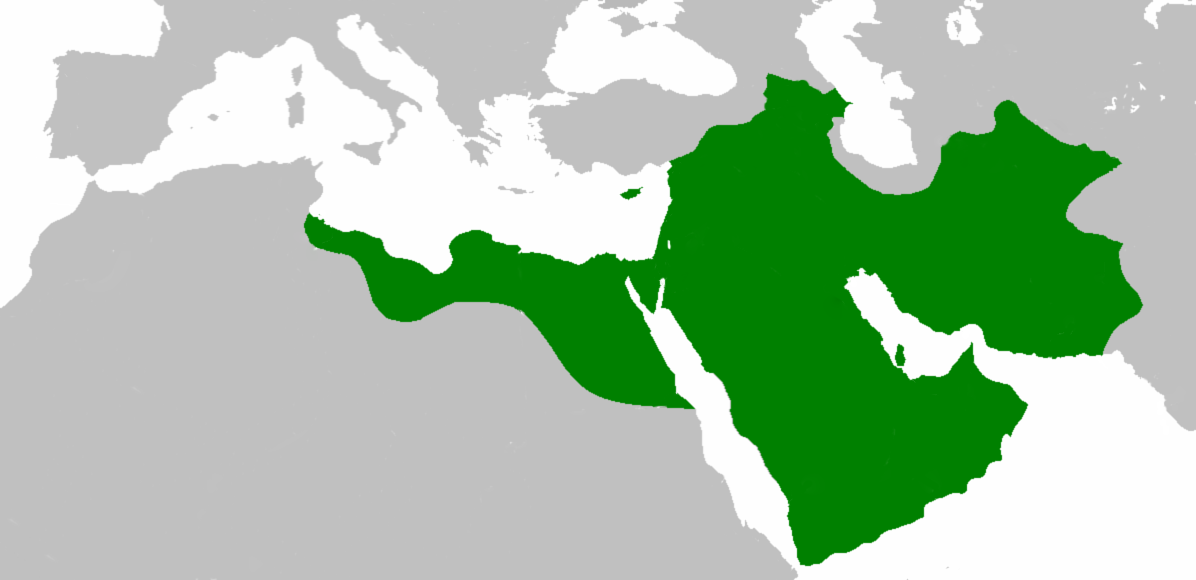
Rashidun Empire at its peak under third Rashidun Caliph, Uthman (654)

During the reign of Caliph Uthman, Constantine III decided to recapture the Levant, which had been lost to the Muslims during Umar's reign. A full-scale invasion was planned and a large force was sent to reconquer Syria. Mu'awiya ibn Abi Sufyan, the governor of Syria, called for reinforcements and Uthman ordered the governor of Kufa to send a contingent, which, together with the local garrison, defeated the Byzantine army in Northern Syria.

In 645–646, Sufyan bin Mujib Al-Azdi, appointed by Mu'awiya, managed to seize Tripoli to eventually capture the last Byzantine stronghold on the Levantine coast.

Uthman gave permission to Mu'awiya to build a navy. From their base in Syria, the Muslims used this fleet to capture Cyprus in 649, Crete, and Rhodes. Annual raids into western Anatolia dissuaded the Byzantines from further attempts to recapture Syria. In 654–655, Uthman ordered the preparation of an expedition to capture Constantinople, but, due to unrest in the caliphate that resulted in his assassination in 655, the expedition was delayed for decades, only to be attempted unsuccessfully under the Umayyads.

=== Early Islamic administration ===
The new rulers divided Syria into four districts (junds): Jund Dimashq (Damascus), Jund Hims, Jund al-Urdunn (Jordan), and Jund Filastin (Palestine) (to which a fifth, Jund Qinnasrin, was later added) and the Arab garrisons were kept apart in camps. There were Islamic taxes instituted called jizya, paid by non-Muslims known as Dhimmis paid to the Islamic conquerors in return for state protection.

=== Rise of the Umayyads ===
When the First Muslim Civil War broke out in the Islamic empire as a result of the murder of Caliph Uthman and the nomination of Ali as his successor, the Rashidun caliphs were succeeded by the Umayyad Caliphate founded by Mu'awiya, with Syria as the core powerbase for the Umayyads and Damascus as their capital for the next century to come.

== See also ==
- Spread of Islam
- Umayyad conquest of North Africa
- 7th century in Lebanon § Administration
- History of Lebanon
- History of Syria
- History of Jordan
- History of Palestine
- History of the Levant

== Bibliography ==
- Athamina, Khalil (July 1994). "The Appointment and Dismissal of Khalid ibn al-Walid from the Supreme Command: A Study of the Political Strategy of the Early Muslim Caliphs in Syria". Arabica. 41 (2). Brill: 253–272. doi:10.1163/157005894X00191. JSTOR 4057449.
- Blankinship, Khalid Yahya, ed. (1993). The History of al-Ṭabarī, Volume XI: The Challenge to the Empires. SUNY Series in Near Eastern Studies. Albany, New York: State University of New York Press. ISBN 978-0-7914-0851-3.
- Bray, R. S. (1996). Armies of Pestilence: The Impact of Disease on History. Cambridge: James Clarke & Co. ISBN 0-227-17240-X.
- Buhl, F. (1993). "Muʾta". In Bosworth, C. E.; van Donzel, E.; Heinrichs, W. P. & Pellat, Ch. (eds.). The Encyclopaedia of Islam, Second Edition. Volume VII: Mif–Naz. Leiden: E. J. Brill. p. 756. ISBN 978-90-04-09419-2.
- Canard, M. (1965). "Al-Djazīra". In Lewis, B.; Pellat, Ch. & Schacht, J. (eds.). The Encyclopaedia of Islam, Second Edition. Volume II: C–G. Leiden: E. J. Brill. pp. 523–524. OCLC 495469475.OCLC 192262392
- Conrad, Lawrence I.; Noth, Albrecht (1994). The Early Arabic Historical tradition: A Source Critical Study. Translated by Michael Bonner (2nd ed.). Princeton: The Darwin Press. ISBN 0-87850-082-0.
- Conrad, Lawrence I. (1981). "Arabic Plague Chronologies and Treatises: Social and Historical Factors in the Formation of a Literary Genre". Studia Islamica. 54 (54): 51–93. doi:10.2307/1595381. JSTOR 1595381. PMID 11618185.
- Christides, V. (1993). "Miṣr — 1. The Byzantine background, the Arab conquest and the Umayyad period, 602–750". In Bosworth, C. E.; van Donzel, E.; Heinrichs, W. P. & Pellat, Ch. (eds.). The Encyclopaedia of Islam, Second Edition. Volume VII: Mif–Naz. Leiden: E. J. Brill. p. 212–213. ISBN 978-90-04-09419-2.
- Dols, M. W. (July–September 1974). "Plague in Early Islamic History". Journal of the American Oriental Society. 94 (3): 371–383. doi:10.2307/600071. JSTOR 600071.
- Donner, Fred M. (1981). The Early Islamic Conquests. Princeton: Princeton University Press. ISBN 0-691-05327-8.
- El Hareir, Idris; M'Baye, El Hadji Ravane (2011). The Different Aspects of Islam Culture: Volume 3, The Spread of Islam throughout the World. UNESCO publishing.
- Elisséeff, Nikita (1965). "Dimashk". In Lewis, B.; Pellat, Ch. & Schacht, J. (eds.). The Encyclopaedia of Islam, Second Edition. Volume II: C–G. Leiden: E. J. Brill. pp. 277–291. OCLC 495469475.
- Friedmann, Yohanan, ed. (1992). The History of al-Ṭabarī, Volume XII: The Battle of al-Qādisīyyah and the Conquest of Syria and Palestine. SUNY Series in Near Eastern Studies. Albany, New York: State University of New York Press. ISBN 978-0-7914-0733-2.
- Gil, Moshe (1997) [1983]. A History of Palestine, 634–1099. Translated by Ethel Broido. Cambridge: Cambridge University Press. ISBN 0-521-59984-9.
- Goitein, S. D. (1986). "Al-Kuds: A. History". In Bosworth, C. E.; van Donzel, E.; Lewis, B. & Pellat, Ch. (eds.). The Encyclopaedia of Islam, Second Edition. Volume V: Khe–Mahi. Leiden: E. J. Brill. pp. 322–339. ISBN 978-90-04-07819-2.
- Haase, C. P. (1997). "Sumaysāṭ". In Bosworth, C. E.; van Donzel, E.; Heinrichs, W. P. & Lecomte, G. (eds.). The Encyclopaedia of Islam, Second Edition. Volume IX: San–Sze. Leiden: E. J. Brill. pp. 871–872. ISBN 978-90-04-10422-8.
- Hinds, Martin (1993). "Muʿāwiya I b. Abī Sufyān". In Bosworth, C. E.; van Donzel, E.; Heinrichs, W. P. & Pellat, Ch. (eds.). The Encyclopaedia of Islam, Second Edition. Volume VII: Mif–Naz. Leiden: E. J. Brill. pp. 263–268. ISBN 978-90-04-09419-2.
- Hitti, Philip Khuri, ed. (1916). The Origins of the Islamic State, Volume 1. London: Columbia University, Longmans, Green & Co. OCLC 622246259.
- Honigmann, M. (1995). "Raʾs al-ʿAyn". In Bosworth, C. E.; van Donzel, E.; Heinrichs, W. P. & Lecomte, G. (eds.). The Encyclopaedia of Islam, Second Edition. Volume VIII: Ned–Sam. Leiden: E. J. Brill. pp. 433–435. ISBN 978-90-04-09834-3.
- Hoyland, R. G. (1997). Seeing Islam as Others Saw It: A Survey and Evaluation of Christian, Jewish, and Zoroastrian Writings on Early Islam. Princeton, New Jersey: Darwin Press. ISBN 0-87850-125-8.
- Humphreys, R. Stephen, ed. (1990). The History of al-Ṭabarī, Volume XV: The Crisis of the Early Caliphate: The Reign of ʿUthmān, A.D. 644–656/A.H. 24–35. SUNY Series in Near Eastern Studies. Albany, New York: State University of New York Press. ISBN 978-0-7914-0154-5.
- Jandora, John W. (1985). "The Battle of the Yarmūk: A Reconstruction". Journal of Asian History. 19 (1): 8–21. JSTOR 41930557.
- Jandora, John W. (1986). "Developments in Islamic Warfare: The Early Conquests". Studia Islamica (64): 101–113. doi:10.2307/1596048. JSTOR 1596048.
- Kaegi, W. E. (2002). "Yarmūk". In Bearman, P. J.; Bianquis, Th.; Bosworth, C. E.; van Donzel, E. & Heinrichs, W. P. (eds.). The Encyclopaedia of Islam, Second Edition. Volume XI: W–Z. Leiden: E. J. Brill. pp. 289–292. ISBN 978-90-04-12756-2.
- Kaegi, Walter E. (1992). Byzantium and the Early Islamic Conquests. Cambridge University Press. ISBN 978-0521411721.
- Kennedy, Hugh (2007). The Great Arab Conquests: How the Spread of Islam Changed the World We Live In. Philadelphia, Pennsylvania: Da Capo Press. ISBN 978-0-306-81740-3.
- Lecker, Michael (2012). "The Jewish Reaction to the Islamic Conquests". In Kreck, Volkhard; Steinicke, Marion (eds.). Dynamics in the History of Religions Between Asia and Europe: Encounters, Notions, and Comparative Perspectives. Brill. ISBN 9789004225350.
- Levy-Rubin, Milka (2009). "Were the Jews Prohibited from Settling in Jerusalem? On the Authenticity of al-Ṭabarī's Jerusalem Surrender Agreement". Jerusalem Studies in Arabic and Islam. 36: 63–81.
- Madelung, Wilferd (1997). The Succession to Muhammad: A Study of the Early Caliphate. Cambridge: Cambridge University Press. ISBN 0-521-56181-7.
- Meinecke, M. (1995). "Al-Rakka". In Bosworth, C. E.; van Donzel, E.; Heinrichs, W. P. & Lecomte, G. (eds.). The Encyclopaedia of Islam, Second Edition. Volume VIII: Ned–Sam. Leiden: E. J. Brill. pp. 410–414. ISBN 978-90-04-09834-3.
- Peters, Francis E. (August 1991). "The Quest for the Historical Muhammad". International Journal of Middle East Studies. 23 (3): 291–315.
- Petersen, Leif Inge Ree (2013). Siege Warfare and Military Organization in the Successor States (400-800 AD): Byzantium, the West and Islam. Leiden: Brill. ISBN 978-90-04-25199-1.
- Scheiner, Jens; Hassanein, Hamada (2019). The Early Muslim Conquest of Syria: An English Translation of al-Azdī's Futūḥ al-Shām. Routledge. ISBN 978-1000690583.
- Shahid, Irfan (2002). Byzantium and the Arabs in the Sixth Century: Volume II, Part I: Toponymy, Monuments, Historical Geography and Frontier Studies. Washington, D. C.: Dumbarton Oaks and Research Library and Collection. ISBN 0-88402-284-6.
- Sharon, Moshe (2021). Corpus Inscriptionum Arabicarum Palaestinae, Volume Seven: J (2) Jerusalem 1. Leiden and Boston: Brill. ISBN 978-90-04-44013-5.
- Shoemaker, Stephen J. (2021). A Prophet Has Appeared: The Rise of Islam Through Christian and Jewish Eyes, a Sourcebook. Oakland: University of California Press. ISBN 9780520299603.
- Sourdel, D. (1965). "Filasṭīn — I. Palestine under Islamic Rule". In Lewis, B.; Pellat, Ch. & Schacht, J. (eds.). The Encyclopaedia of Islam, Second Edition. Volume II: C–G. Leiden: E. J. Brill. pp. 910–913. OCLC 495469475.
- Sourdel-Thomine, J. (1960). "Amwas". In Gibb, H. A. R.; Kramers, J. H.; Lévi-Provençal, E.; Schacht, J.; Lewis, B. & Pellat, Ch. (eds.). The Encyclopaedia of Islam, Second Edition. Volume I: A–B. Leiden: E. J. Brill. pp. 460–461. OCLC 495469456.
- Wakeley, James Moreton (2017). The Futuḥ al Sham of al Azdi al Basri Syrian narrative history. Oxford–Mainz–Vienna–Princeton Graduate Exchange. University of Oxford.
- Wensinck, A. J. (1960). "ʿAmr b. al-ʿĀṣ al-Sahmī". In Gibb, H. A. R.; Kramers, J. H.; Lévi-Provençal, E.; Schacht, J.; Lewis, B. & Pellat, Ch. (eds.). The Encyclopaedia of Islam, Second Edition. Volume I: A–B. Leiden: E. J. Brill. p. 451. OCLC 495469456.
- Zein, Ibrahim; El-Wakil, Ahmed (2020). "Khālid b. al-Wālid's Treaty with the People of Damascus: Identifying the Source Document through Shared and Competing Historical Memories". Journal of Islamic Studies. 31 (3): 295–328. doi:10.1093/jis/etaa029.
