= Siege of Edessa (639) =

Siege of the Arab–Byzantine wars

Conquest of Edessa (639)
- Part of the Muslim conquest of Syria (Arab–Byzantine wars)
- Region of Osrhoene were Raqqa (Kallinikos) and Edessa are located
Date	639
Location	Edessa, Turkey
Result	Rashidun victory

Belligerents
Rashidun Caliphate	Byzantine Empire

Commanders and leaders
Iyad ibn Ghanm	Ptolemy

Strength
5,000 men	Unknown

Casualties and losses
Unknown	Unknown

The Conquest of Edessa was a military engagement between the Muslim Rashidun army and the Byzantine garrison of Edessa. The Muslims under Iyad ibn Ghanm launched their invasion of Mesopotamia and captured the city of Edessa.

== Background ==
After the Rashidun general Iyad ibn Ghanm has launched his invasion of Mesopotamia, his forces secured their first victory by conquering Raqqa in 639. Afterwards, the Muslims began advancing further into Mesopotamia. In 637, earlier before Iyad's invasion, the Byzantine governor of Osrhoene John Cateas, attempted to halt the advancing Muslim armies by offering tribute to them, but his action was rejected by Emperor Heraclius and he was removed from office. Cateas was succeeded by Ptolmey. The new governor offered little resistance to Muslims who overran Syria, Iraq and their occupation of northern Mesopotamia was a matter of time.

After capturing Raqqa, the Muslims advanced towards Harran, there the inhabitants of Harran shut themselves. They dispatched a word to Iyad informing them that the city is partially under their control and asked him to go to Edessa promising to accept whatever terms he may make with it, and leaving him free to negotiate with the Christians of Harran. Hearing this, the Muslims advanced to Edessa.

== Siege ==
Arriving at Edessa, the Muslims found Edessa resistive. The Byzantine garrison began bombarding the Muslims with missiles for an hour. Shortly afterwards, the Byzantine garrison launched a sortie against the Muslims. However, they were routed and forced back to the city. After their defeat, the Byzantine garrison demanded surrender. The Muslims granted to the Bishop of Edessa the lives and properties of the Christians in the city. in return they were required to pay one dinar and two measures of flour one for each male citizen, to maintain the roads and bridges in good repair, to give help to Muslim armies and to support in good faith their cause. A first Muslim governor named certain Abu Badr was placed.

== Aftermath ==
Afterwards, the Muslims went back to Harran which capitulated on similar terms. The Muslims continued their campaign and captured Samosata and other Mesopotamian cities.

== Sources ==
- Philip Khuri Hitti (1916), The Origins of the Islamic State, Volume I.
- Hugh Kennedy (2022), History of the Arab Invasions: The Conquest of the Lands, A New Translation of Al-Baladhuri's Futuh Al-Buldan.
- J. B. Segal (1970), Edessa, 'The Blessed City', Vol II.
