= Mistah bin Athāthah =

Mistah ibn Athatha ibn ʿAbbād ibn al-Muṭṭalib al-Muṭṭalibī (Arabic: مسطح بن أثاثة بن عباد بن المطلب المطلبي), nicknamed as Abu ʿAbbād, was a companion of the Islamic prophet Muhammad. He participated in several in the Battle of Uhud, the Battle of Badr and other battles alongside Muhammad.

== Life and lineage ==
Misṭaḥ ibn Athātha was born to Umm Misṭaḥ bint Abī Rahm ibn al-Muṭṭalib ibn ʿAbd Manāf ibn Quṣayy. His mother was among those who pledged allegiance to Muhammad. His lineage traces back to ʿAbd Manāf ibn Quṣayy. Misṭaḥ held several nicknames, including al-Muṭṭalibī, al-Muhājirī, and al-Badrī.

Ibn Sa'd described Misṭaḥ as a short man with sunken eyes and thick fingers.

Misṭaḥ was known to be poor and he received financial support from Abu Bakr, his first cousin once removed, because of Misṭaḥ's poverty and his relationship to him.

Muhammad established a brotherhood between Misṭaḥ ibn Athātha and Zayd ibn al-Mazīd, as narrated by Muḥammad ibn Isḥāq.

Muhammad gave Misṭaḥ and Ibn Ilyās fifty qīrs (a measurement of grain) in Khaybar.

== Involvement in the incident of Al-Ifk ==
Misṭaḥ was among those involved in the incident of Al-Ifk, an incident that occurred when Aisha, the wife of Muhammad, lost her necklace during a military expedition (Ghazwah). While the army departed, Aisha stayed behind to search for her necklace, eventually falling asleep. Safwan bin Al-Muattal, who was at the back of the army, found her the next morning and helped her return to the army. Upon their return, some individuals slandered Aisha, falsely claiming she had fornicated with Safwan.

The situation was resolved when Surah 24:11–26 was revealed, revealing her innocence.

During this incident, Misṭaḥ participated in the false accusations, which led Abu Bakr, who had been financially supporting him, to cut off his aid. However, when Surah 24:22 was revealed, "Do not let the people of virtue and affluence among you swear to suspend donations to their relatives, the needy, and the emigrants in the cause of Allah. Let them pardon and forgive. Do you not love to be forgiven by Allah? And Allah is All-Forgiving, Most Merciful", Abu Bakr resumed his support for Misṭaḥ, forgave him and said "Yes, by Allah, I would like that Allah forgive me" and he also said "By Allah, I will never deprive him of it at all".

=== Punishment and repentance ===
As a result of his involvement in the slander, Misṭaḥ, alongside Hassan ibn Thabit and Hamna bint Jahsh, were later punished under the order of Muhammad and he repented from his actions.

It is said that his punishment was flogging.

== Wars ==
Mistah participated in several battles such as Battle of Uhud, the Battle of Badr and other battles alongside Muhammad.

It was said he also participated in Battle of Ṣiffīn in the band of Ali bin Abi Talib and therefore died on the year 37 A.H.

== Death ==
Misṭaḥ ibn Athātha died in the year 34 AH (655 CE) at the age of fifty-six, or in the year 37 AH (657 CE).
