= Battle of Dawmat al-Jandal =

633 clash between the Rashidun Caliphate and rebel Arab tribes

Battle of Daumat al-Jandal
- Part of Ridda wars and Campaigns of Khalid ibn al-Walid
Date	August 633 CE
Location	Daumat al-Jandal in Saudi Arabia
Result	Muslim victory

Belligerents
Rashidun Caliphate	Arab Christian rebels

Commanders and leaders
Khalid ibn al-Walid; Iyad ibn Ghanm	Judi ibn Rabi'a †; Ukaidar ibn Abdulmalik al-Kindi †

Strength
10,000	12,000–15,000

Casualties and losses
Minimal	Heavy

The Battle of Daumat al-Jandal took place between Muslims and Rebel Arab tribes in August 633 CE. This was a part of the Riddah wars. Daumat al-Jandal was given to Iyad ibn Ghanm to crush the rebels, but he failed in doing so, and sent for help to Khalid ibn Walid who was in Iraq in those days.

== Background ==
Dawmat al-Jandal was one of the large commercial towns of Arabia, widely known for its rich and much-frequented market. It was also an important communication centre, a meeting point of routes from Central Arabia, Iraq and Syria. At about the time when Khalid ibn Walid set off from Yamamah for the invasion of Iraq, Abu Bakr had sent Iyad ibn Ghanm to capture Daumat-ul-Jandal and once again bring the northern tribes into submission. Iyad may have been the Muslim commander who defeated an Arab tribal revolt in the oasis town of Dumat al-Jandal during the Ridda wars of 632–633. Iyad arrived at Daumat-ul-Jandal to find it strongly defended by Banu Kalb, a large Christian Arab tribe inhabiting this region and the eastern fringe of Syria.

He deployed his force against the southern face of the fort known as Marid, and the situation that now developed was, from the military point of view, absurd. The Christian Arabs considered themselves to be under siege, but the routes from the northern side of the fort were open. The Muslims, engaged closely against the fort, considered themselves so heavily committed that they could not break contact. According to early historians both sides were under siege! The operations consisted mainly of archery and sallies by the garrison of the fort. This state of affairs continued for several weeks until both sides felt equally tired and equally hurt by the stalemate. Then one day a Muslim officer said to Iyad, In certain circumstances wisdom is better than a large army. Send to Khalid for help. Iyad agreed. He wrote Khalid ibn al-Walid a letter explaining the situation at Daumat-ul-Jandal and seeking his help.

This letter reached Khalid as he was about to leave Ain-ut-Tamr for al-Hira. The situation on the Iraq front was now stable and he had able lieutenants to deal with the Persians. With an army of about 6,000 men, he left Ain-ut-Tamr the following day to join Iyad. The movement of Khalid was discovered by the defenders of Daumat-ul-Jandal a good many days before his arrival, and there was alarm in the fort. With their present strength they could hold off the Muslim force under Iyad, but they would not have a chance if Khalid's army also took the field against them. In desperate haste they sent couriers racing to neighbouring tribes. The Christian Arab tribes responded spiritedly to the appeal for help. Contingents from several clans of the Ghassanids and the Kalb joined the defenders of the fort, many of them camping under the fort walls because of the insufficient room within the fort.

== Battle ==
Khalid ibn al-Walid took Iyad under command and incorporated his detachment into his own army. He deployed Iyad's men on the south of the fort to block the Arabian route and positioned part of his army of Iraq to the east, the north and the west of the fort, covering the routes to Iraq and Jordan; and kept the remainder back as a strong reserve. Khalid appreciated that at present the fort was strongly manned and to storm it in its present state would prove a costly operation. He therefore decided to wait, in the hope that the defenders, tiring of the siege, would sally out to fight him in the open. Then he could inflict the maximum damage upon them and storm the fort after the garrison had been weakened. He accordingly held his forces some distance back from the fort.

The Christian Arab commander Judi waited for the Muslims to make the first move, but the Muslims remained inactive. When some time had passed and Judi saw that the besiegers were making no attempt to close up on the fort, he decided to attack first; he ordered two sallies. One group would attack Iyad on the Arabian route while the other, a large group comprising his own clan, the Wadi'a, operating under his direct command, would attack Khalid ibn al-Walid's camp to the north. Iyad drove back the Arabs who came out to attack him.

The other and larger group — the clan of Wadi'a operating under Judi — came out at the same time as the group against Iyad, and made for Khalid, who stood back from the fort and deployed his army for battle. Seeing no move from Khalid's side, Judi decided to charge. He formed up his clan for battle and advanced to meet Khalid. The two forces were now very close. Then suddenly Khalid ordered a general attack and struck at Judi with the utmost violence and speed. In minutes they had collapsed. Judi was captured along with hundreds of his clansmen, while the rest, losing all cohesion and order, fled in panic towards the fort. The Arabs who had remained in the fort saw a horde rushing towards the gate of which at least half was Muslim. They closed the gate in the face of their comrades, and the clan of Wadi'a which had sallied out with Judi was locked out. Hundreds were made prisoner by the Muslims. The rest perished, some in the short violent battle and the rest in the pursuit to and the fighting at the gate. Khalid took Judi and his captive clansmen near the fort for all to see; on his order Judi and the captives were beheaded.

The siege continued for a number of days. Then one day Khalid stormed the fort. The defenders put up such resistance as they could, but against the superb, battle-conditioned troops of Khalid they never had a chance. Most of the garrison was slaughtered, but women and children and many youths were taken captive. This happened in about the last week of August 633 CE.

== Aftermath ==
Khalid spent the next few days in settling the affairs of Daumat-ul-Jandal. Then he set off for Hira, taking Iyad with him as a subordinate general. Reaching Hira, he found the situation bad once again at the Iraq front.

== On-line Resources ==
A. I. Akram, The Sword of Allah: Khalid bin al-Waleed, His Life and Campaigns Lahore, 1969
