= Al-Jazira (caliphal province) =

Province of Arab Islamic caliphates

- Province of the Rashidun, Umayyad and Abbasid Caliphates (639–940s)
- Capital: Raqqa, Harran, Mosul
- Historical era: Early Islamic period
  - Established: 639/40
  - Muslim conquest and incorporation into Jund Hims: 639/40
  - Administrative separation with Jund Qinnasrin from Jund Hims: 661–683
  - Independent province, separated from Jund Qinnasrin: 692
  - Decline of Abbasids after assassination of al-Mutawakkil: 861
  - End of Caliphate's rule under al-Qahir and al-Radi: 940s
  - Takeover by Fatimids, Hamdanids and other dynasties: 970s

Al-Jazira (Arabic: الْجَزِيرَة), also known as Jazirat Aqur or Iqlim Aqur, was a province of the Rashidun, Umayyad and Abbasid caliphates, spanning at minimum most of Upper Mesopotamia (al-Jazira proper), divided between the districts of Diyar Bakr, Diyar Rabi'a and Diyar Mudar. At times, the province included Mosul, Arminiya and Adharbayjan as sub-provinces.

Following its conquest by the Muslim Arabs in 639/40, it became an administrative unit attached to the larger district of Jund Hims. It was separated from Hims during the reigns of caliphs Mu'awiya I or Yazid I and came under the jurisdiction of Jund Qinnasrin. It was made its own province in 692 by Caliph Abd al-Malik. After 702, it frequently came to span the key districts of Arminiya and Adharbayjan along the Caliphate's northern frontier, making it a super-province. The predominance of Arabs from the Qays/Mudar and Rabi'a groups made it a major recruitment pool of tribesmen for the Umayyad armies and the troops of the Jazira played a key military role under the Umayyad caliphs in the 8th century, peaking under the last Umayyad caliph, Marwan II (r. 744–750), until the toppling of the Umayyads by the Abbasids in 750.

== Geography ==
The Jazira proper spanned the northern part of the area between the Euphrates and Tigris rivers (Upper Mesopotamia), as well as adjacent areas and cities lying north and east of the upper Tigris, the areas around the Great and Little Zab rivers, and the strip of territory off the western banks of the Euphrates. The region is generally a relatively low plateau, punctuated by a number of mountain ranges, including the Tur Abdin, Jabal Sinjar, Jabal Makhul and Jabal Abd al-Aziz. From these mountains emanate the major streams of the Euphrates, namely the Balikh in the far west of the region, the Khabur in the center and the Hirmas (a tributary of the Khabur) in the north from Tur Abdin. The Tharthar river emanates from Jabal Sinjar in the east and flows out into the Syrian Desert where it ends.

To the west of the Jazira was the province of Bilad al-Sham (geographic Syria). To the northwest was the Thughur al-Jaziriyya, the Upper Mesopotamian frontier with the Byzantine Empire. The provinces of Arminiya (e.g. Armenia) and Adharbayjan laid to the north and northeast, respectively. Iraq laid to the south, separated from the Jazira by a line running from Anbar in the southwest to Takrit in northeast.

=== Tribal and ethnic composition ===
Before the Muslim conquest in 638–640, there were long-established nomadic and semi-nomadic Arab tribes in the desert fringes of the upper and lower Euphrates valley and, to a lesser degree, nearer to the settlements along the river banks. Among these tribes were the semi-nomadic and settled Tanukh, parts of which inhabited the stretch of the Euphrates between Anbar and Hit and further north. Near them, further west into the desert, were the Taghlib and al-Namir ibn Qasit tribes of the Rabi'a confederation and the Iyad tribe, all components of the Nizar group, whose members served as auxiliaries of the Sasanian Empire. According to accounts in the history of al-Tabari (d. 923), the Christian Iyad tribe fled north into Byzantine Anatolia during the Muslim conquest, but Caliph Umar (r. 634–644) compelled the Byzantines to expel most of them back to the Jazira. The Taghlib had stayed on and largely retained their Christian faith as other tribesmen embraced Islam. The Taghlib formed a large part of the old-established Rabi'a tribes in the Jazira, but other Rabi'a tribes there, namely those of the Banu Bakr confederation, also retained their Christianity in the first few years following the conquest.

The Byzantine–Sasanian wars of the early 7th century, followed by the Muslim conquests, had left an abundance of abandoned cultivable lands in the Jazira. These lands were occupied by the nomadic components of the Muslim armies, mainly from the Qays tribes, over whom the commanders appointed by Medina had little to no control, and who paid the minimal tithes to the caliphs. According to the historian Muhammad Abdulhayy Shaban, "these few thousand men treated a whole province as their private property and as such established their rule there". The Muslim tribesmen played a key military role in defending the eastern flank of Syria from Byzantine incursions, and benefited from the lucrative raids into Armenia. The conquering tribes of the Muslim armies attempted to limit further tribal immigration to the Jazira, but the vast area and wealth of the province, and the pressures of immigration from Arabia into the conquered Fertile Crescent necessitated the opening of the Jazira to newer arrivals.

Caliph Uthman (r. 644–656) resolved to direct immigration to the region and according to Shaban, "break the hegemony" of the conquering tribes. Upon the caliph's instructions, Mu'awiya ibn Abi Sufyan, who governed the region, settled Arab tribesmen on unclaimed or vacant lands in the Jazira, some distance away from the settlements along the Euphrates, and gave them permission to engage in agriculture. Members of the Tamim were established at a place called al-Rabiya and tribesmen from the Qays and the Asad were settled at al-Mazihin and al-Mudaibir, the last in the vicinity of Raqqa. Likely to assuage the concerns of the earlier-established Qays tribesmen, the newer arrivals were excluded from military service on the Armenian frontier and were placed in strategically located points, such as intersections of major routes or narrow mountain passes, to act as a buffer against Byzantine assaults. Among the places garrisoned by these tribesmen was Melitene (called Malatiya by the Arabs). The changes were instituted gradually throughout Mu'awiya's governorship, and were likely satisfactory enough for the Qays to support Mu'awiya against Caliph Ali (r. 656–661) and his Iraqi army during the Battle of Siffin near Raqqa in 657. Throughout the course of the First Muslim Civil War (656–661), further immigration to the Jazira took place; the new arrivals were tribesmen who had settled in the Muslim garrison cities of Kufa and Basra in Iraq in earlier decades but opposed Ali's rule and abandoned settled life for nomadism in the Jazira. (Note: Among the Kufan and Basran emigrants who settled in the Jazira during the First Muslim Civil War were the following tribal nobles: Zufar ibn al-Harith al-Kilabi and the family of Rabi'a ibn Asim al-Uqayli, both chiefs of the Banu Amir in Basra, moved to the Jazira after the Battle of the Camel in 656. Hatim ibn al-Nu'man and his family, the Banu Hatim, of the Bahila were expelled from Basra by Caliph Ali. Adi ibn Amira al-Kindi and most of his small Kindite clan of Banu Arqam, migrated from Kufa at the start of the civil war, established themselves in Edessa and later may have become associated with the Qays unlike the bulk of the Kindites, who were associated with the rival Yaman faction.)

Besides Arabs the Jazira contained a significant Assyrian component, particularly in the Tur Abdin area. The area of Mosul was also home to Kurds, while north of the upper Tigris were communities of Armenians. Finally, since Shapur II gained control of Nisibis in 363, the major cities in the region, especially around Nisibis, were settled with Persians from Fars who remained a significant presence up to Abbasid times.

=== Administrative divisions ===
The Jazira was divided into three districts, with the Diyar Mudar comprising the territory along the Euphrates, the Diyar Rabi'a along the Tigris, and the Diyar Bakr stretching north to the Armenian Highlands. The division was along tribal lines, based on the dominant tribal group in each territory, i.e., the Mudar and the Rabi'a. The districts' bearing of Arab tribal names was indicative of the large presence of Arab tribesmen in the province, which likely accounts for its military strength, as it possessed a larger recruitment pool of tribesmen for the Umayyad armies than other provinces. The division may have also reflected pre-Islamic administrative norms, for Diyar Mudar corresponded with the Roman-Byzantine province of Osrhoene, which before Roman rule had been a kingdom ruled by an Arab dynasty, and later became a center of Monophysite Christianity. The larger Diyar Rabi'a, on the other hand, had less well-defined boundaries, and had been the principal zone of conflict between the Byzantine and Sasanian empires in the pre-Islamic period. In the sources, the city of Mosul was at times considered part of Diyar Rabi'a—including as its capital—but for most of the Umayyad period, it was its own province.

== History ==
=== Early administration ===
The Jazira was conquered by the Muslims during the caliphate of Umar, in 638/639 or 639/40. The Muslim armies were led by Iyad ibn Ghanm al-Fihri. Iyad ibn Ghanm frequently besieged walled settlements along the Euphrates and Khabur rivers before or during harvest time, while sending detachments of troops to raid the surrounding countryside for agricultural supplies and captives among the peasantry. In the case of Raqqa (Kallinikos to the Byzantines), the peasants outside the city walls were defended by the Arab Christian nomads. There, the Muslim forces compelled the city's leaders, facing the prospect of starvation, to surrender within five or six days. Iyad ibn Ghanm's objective was to capture cities with minimal destruction, so as to ensure the flow of tax revenue, as well as agricultural goods, to the conquerors. Similar terms of surrender were reached with the leaders of Edessa, Harran, and Samosata, and Muslim garrisons were installed in the last two cities.

Following the conquest, the Jazira likely formed a single administrative unit with Jund Hims (military district of Homs) and the future district of Jund Qinnasrin (military district of northern Syria). Iyad ibn Ghanm was appointed governor of Hims–Qinnasrin–Jazira by Umar in 639, following the death of Abu Ubayda ibn al-Jarrah, who had held the overall command over Syria. Two administrative agents were appointed over the Jazira, one in charge of non-Arabs (presumably the settled population) and one for the nomadic Arab tribesmen, such as the Taghlib. Umar appointed Habib ibn Maslama al-Fihri over the non-Arabs and al-Walid ibn Uqba over the Arabs. Iyad died in 641 and was succeeded by Sa'id ibn Hidhyam al-Jumahi. After the latter's death in 642 Umayr ibn Sa'd al-Ansari was appointed governor. Umayr ibn Sa'd became ill during Uthman's caliphate and stepped down from his post, after which Uthman attached the Hims–Qinnasrin–Jazira district to Mu'awiya ibn Abi Sufyan's jurisdiction; Mu'awiya was already governor of Jund Dimashq (military district of Damascus) and Jund al-Urdunn (military district of the Jordan) at the time.

Mu'awiya established the Umayyad Caliphate in 661 and ruled as caliph until his death in 680, after which he was succeeded by his son Yazid I (r. 680–683). During Mu'awiya's or Yazid's reign, the Qinnasrin and the Jazira were separated from Jund Hims and became the Jund Qinnasrin district. The separation may have been a response to the influx of Arab immigrant tribesmen during Mu'awiya's governorship and caliphate. The Jazira's association with the Syrian districts was a continuation of Roman and Byzantine-era arrangements, where the two regions formed the Diocese of the East. Nonetheless, the composition of the Arab tribes in the Jazira in the post-conquest period, characterized by the predominance of the Mudar group (e.g. Qays, Asad, Tamim), made it "a somewhat separate entity", according to the historian Khalid Yahya Blankinship. Although the original Qaysi conquerors tolerated the flow of immigrants during Mu'awiya's lifetime, they resented that their territory was singled out for the resettlement of outside tribesmen, rather than Syria proper where the tribes who later constituted the Yaman faction and were closely allied to the Umayyads held sway. In general, in the time up to the 690s, the new Muslim government did not involve itself to much into local affairs: few Muslim garrison cities were built in the region, the local religious communities continued their affairs unharrased and possibly the jizya was not levied.

=== Independent province ===
During the Second Muslim Civil War, the Qays tribes of the Jazira backed the Mecca-based opponent of the Syria-based Umayyads, Abd Allah ibn al-Zubayr. They had no special attachment to the Umayyads, whom they resented for opening the Jazira to immigration, and may have hoped that Ibn al-Zubayr would restore their autonomy. The Qays were routed by the Umayyads and their Arab tribal allies, chief among them the Banu Kalb, at the Battle of Marj Rahit near Damascus in 684. A leader of the Qays, Zufar ibn al-Harith al-Kilabi, afterward rallied the tribe's opposition to the Umayyads from the fortified Jaziran town of Qarqisiya (Circesium), located near the confluence of the Euphrates and Khabur rivers. Between about 686 and 689 Zufar and his Qaysi ally Umayr ibn al-Hubab al-Sulami engaged the Kalb in the Palmyrene steppe and the Taghlib and its Rabi'a allies throughout the Jazira in a series of raids and counter-raids, known in the Arabic sources as the ayyam ([battle]-days). The Taghlib, whose conflict with the Qays stemmed from the latter's encroachments on their grazing pastures and water sources, were generally bested during these battles, but killed Umayr in 689, while the Kalb were driven out of the Palmyrene steppe where the Qays became the dominant power.

Muhammad ibn Marwan, the son of Caliph Marwan I (r. 684–685), founder of the Marwanid ruling house of the Umayyad dynasty, was appointed by his father to the military command of the Jazira to keep the Qaysi rebels in check. After a number of Umayyad sieges against Qarqisiya, Zufar surrendered to Caliph Abd al-Malik (r. 685–705) in 691, abandoning Ibn al-Zubayr's cause and obtaining military and courtly privileges for himself and his sons. The civil war ended with Ibn al-Zubayr's slaying in 692, but raids and counter-raids between the Qays, mainly represented by the Banu Sulaym tribe, and the Taghlib continued from that year until coming to an end in 694 after Abd al-Malik's interventions. Abd al-Malik separated the Jazira from Jund Qinnasrin in 692, possibly making it into a jund (military district). According to Blankinship, this change of status may have been related to the settlement reached with Zufar and the Qays in 691. According to the historian Hugh N. Kennedy, it was done at the request of Muhammad ibn Marwan, Abd al-Malik's brother, and thenceforth the tribal troops of the province "lived off its revenues". After their victory in 692, Abd al-Malik ordered a census to be made in the region and latest from that time, the jizya was demanded from non-Muslims, as sources such as the Chronicle of Zuqnin report. At the same time, the involvement of the Muslim governors into affairs of the East Syrian and West Syrian churches increased. As such, Bishr ibn Marwan installed Yohannan, the bishop of Nisibis, as catholicos of the East Syrian church in opposition to the elected Hnanisho I. Nevertheless, during the overlordship of Muhammad ibn Marwan Christians continued to be local headsmen, such as Simeon of the Olives or Theodotus of Amida.

=== Super-province ===
Mosul became a dependency of the Jazira in 721–725, a period in which the Jaziran troops had attained prominence among the Umayyad armies for their suppression of the major rebellion of Yazid ibn al-Muhallab in Iraq in 720. More politically and militarily significant than Mosul were the northern frontier regions of Arminiya and Adharbayjan, which were attached to Muhammad ibn Marwan's Jaziran governorship in 702. Together the Jazira, Arminiya and Adharbayjan constituted the super-province of Jazira. The two frontier districts were detached from the Jazira by Caliph Yazid II (r. 720–724) in 721/22 and troops from Jund Hims were brought in to garrison them. The Jaziran troops most likely had to cede the districts to the Syrians in light of their significantly more lucrative assignments to Iraq and the far eastern provinces of the Caliphate. Yazid's successor Hisham withdrew the Jazirans from Iraq and the east in 724 and restored their control over Arminiya and Adharbayjan in 726, likely as compensation. The renewed war with the Khazars in the two frontier regions prompted Hisham to reassign control of them to the Syrians in 727, but the destruction of this Syrian army by the Khazars at Ardabil in 730, paved the way for the restoration of Jaziran dominance from that point onward.

The Jaziran super-province became a power base of Muhammad ibn Marwan's son, the future Umayyad caliph Marwan II, in 732. Following the death of Caliph Yazid III in 744 Marwan attempted to build a new center of power in Harran with his Jaziran army against the established Syrian army. With his mainly Jaziran troops he defeated Sulayman ibn Hisham, the son of Caliph Hisham, near Damascus and became caliph. Under Marwan II the Jazirans were in the ascendant over the Syrians, hitherto the principal military element of the Umayyad Caliphate.

Although the Jazirans were largely able to suppress the renewed dissensions against the Umayyads in Iraq, the main challenge to the dynasty emanated from the far eastern frontier province of Khurasan. In the words of Kennedy, there ensued what "can be seen as the struggle of one frontier army, Marwān's men from the Jazīra and the Caucasus [Adharbayjan and Arminiya], against another, the pro-Abbasid troops from Khurāsān. The Syrians and Iraqis, whose rivalries had dominated so much of early Islamic history, were little more than spectators." The Abbasids and their troops from Khurasan captured Kufa in 749 and proceeded to assault the Jazira in 750, where they inflicted a decisive defeat against Marwan's troops, gathered from the Jazira and Syria, at the Battle of the Zab.

== Bibliography ==
- Blankinship, Khalid Yahya (1994). The End of the Jihâd State: The Reign of Hishām ibn ʻAbd al-Malik and the Collapse of the Umayyads. Albany, New York: State University of New York Press. ISBN 978-0-7914-1827-7.
- Canard, M. (1965). "Djazira". In Lewis, B.; Pellat, Ch. & Schacht, J. (eds.). The Encyclopaedia of Islam, Second Edition. Volume II: C–G. Leiden: E. J. Brill. pp. 523–524. OCLC 495469475.
- Crone, Patricia (1980). Slaves on Horses: The Evolution of the Islamic Polity (1980 ed.). Cambridge: Cambridge University Press. ISBN 978-0521229616.
- Dixon, 'Abd al-Ameer 'Abd (August 1969). The Umayyad Caliphate 65–86/684–705: A Political Study (Thesis). University of London, School of Oriental and African Studies.
- Donner, Fred M. (1981). The Early Islamic Conquests. Princeton: Princeton University Press. ISBN 0-691-05327-8.
- Hinds, M. (1993). "Muʿāwiya I b. Abī Sufyān". In Bosworth, C. E.; van Donzel, E.; Heinrichs, W. P. & Pellat, Ch. (eds.). The Encyclopaedia of Islam, Second Edition. Volume VII: Mif–Naz. Leiden: E. J. Brill. pp. 263–268. ISBN 978-90-04-09419-2.
- Hoyland, Robert G.; Brunner, Kyle B.; Tannous, Jack Boulos Victor (2021). The Life of Simeon of the Olives: An Entrepreneurial Saint of Early Islamic North Mesopotamia. Gorgias Press LLC. ISBN 978-1-4632-4346-3.
- Humphreys, R. Stephen, ed. (1990). The History of al-Ṭabarī, Volume XV: The Crisis of the Early Caliphate: The Reign of ʿUthmān, A.D. 644–656/A.H. 24–35. SUNY Series in Near Eastern Studies. Albany, New York: State University of New York Press. ISBN 978-0-7914-0154-5.
- Juynboll, Gautier H.A., ed. (1989). The History of al-Ṭabarī, Volume XIII: The Conquest of Iraq, Southwestern Persia, and Egypt: The Middle Years of ʿUmar's Caliphate, A.D. 636–642/A.H. 15–21. SUNY Series in Near Eastern Studies. Albany, New York: State University of New York Press. ISBN 978-0-88706-876-8.
- Kennedy, Hugh (2001). The Armies of the Caliphs: Military and Society in the Early Islamic State. London and New York: Routledge. ISBN 0-415-25093-5.
- Kennedy, Hugh (2004) [1986]. The Prophet and the Age of the Caliphates: The Islamic Near East from the 6th to the 11th Century (Second ed.). Harlow: Longman. ISBN 978-0-582-40525-7.
- Madelung, Wilferd (1997). The Succession to Muhammad: A Study of the Early Caliphate. Cambridge: Cambridge University Press. ISBN 0-521-56181-7.
- Petersen, Leif Inge Ree (2013). Siege Warfare and Military Organization in the Successor States (400–800 AD): Byzantium, the West and Islam. Leiden: Brill. ISBN 978-90-04-25199-1.
- Ritter, Hellmut (2013). The Ocean of the Soul: Men, the World and God in the Stories of Farīd al-Dīn Aṭṭar. Translated by John O'Kane. Leiden: Brill. ISBN 978-90-04-12068-6.
- Shaban, M. A. (1971). Islamic History: A New Interpretation, Volume 1, A. D. 600–750 (A. H. 132). Cambridge: Cambridge University Press. ISBN 978-0-521-08137-5.
