= Jund Hims =

Military district of Syrian province in the Arab Caliphate

Syria (Bilad al-Sham) and its provinces under the Abbasid Caliphate in the 9th century

Jund Ḥimṣ (Arabic: جند حمص, "military district of Homs") was one of the military districts of the caliphal province of Syria.

== Geography ==
The capital of Jund Hims was Homs, from which the district received its name. Its principal urban centres in the 10th century were Latakia, Palmyra, Jableh, Kafartab, Tarsus, Salamiyah, Bulunyas and the Fortress of Khawabi. The southern boundary line of Jund Hims laid immediately to the south of Qara, while its northern limit lay beyond the village of al-Qurayshiyya, a village on the Mediterranean coast. Eastward were the towns of Palmyra and al-Qaryatayn.

== History ==
After the Muslim conquest of Syria in the 7th century CE, Caliph Umar (r. 634–644) divided Syria into four districts, in which Jund Hims became the northernmost district. It initially encompassed the territory of Jund Hims proper, the territory of the future district of Jund Qinnasrin in far northern Syria, and the Jazira (i.e. Upper Mesopotamia). During and immediately following the Muslim conquest of the city of Homs (Emesa to the Byzantines), the city became home to a substantial concentration of South Arabian tribesmen from the Himyar, Hamdan, Kinda, Khawlan, Alhan and Hadhramawt groups. These South Arabian tribes, excluding the Kinda, formed the core of the Qahtan faction in Syria, and were the first tribes to adopt Qahtan as a collective name, according to the historian Werner Caskel. A number of the urban Ansar of Medina also settled in Homs. After the conquest, tribesmen from the formerly Byzantine-allied Quda'a group of Kalb, Salih, Tanukh, and Bahra', all long-established in Syria before the conquests, settled in Jund Hims. The original leading Muslim households of Homs were those of al-Simt ibn Aswad of Kinda, the Dhu'l-Kala of Himyar, and the family of Hawshab Dhu Zulaym of Alhan, all of whom participated in the conquest of Syria. The head of the Dhu'l-Kala, Samayfa, led the troops of Jund Hims on the side of Syria's governor Mu'awiya ibn Abi Sufyan at the Battle of Siffin against Caliph Ali (r. 656–661). Samayfa and Hawshab died in that battle, and Samayfa was succeeded by his son Shurahbil as leader of the troops of Jund Hims, until Shurahbil's death at the Battle of Khazir in 686. Al-Simt's son Shurahbil may have been the sub-governor of Jund Hims during Mu'awiya's overall governorship (646–661) and/or caliphate (661–680).

The Quda'a, allied with the Kinda and Ghassan, were closely allied with the Umayyads and had significant presence in the junds of Hims, Dimashq (Damascus) and Urdunn (Jordan). They were involved in a rivalry with the Qahtan for tribal preeminence in Syria in these districts and in Jund Filastin (Palestine), where the dominant tribe was the Judham. The Judham was politically divided, with one section opting for alignment with the Qahtan and a junior faction opting for the Quda'a. Meanwhile, in the northern regions of Jund Hims, i.e. Qinnasrin and the Jazira, the north Arabian Qays were dominant, forming the third faction in Syrian tribo-politics. During the rule of the Umayyad caliphs Mu'awiya I (r. 661–680) or Yazid I (r. 680–683) the Qinnasrin–Jazira was administratively separated from Jund Hims, due to the dominance of the Qays in those regions.

After the death of Yazid and his son and successor, Mu'awiya II, in 683 and 684, the Quda'a, Kinda, Ghassan, as well as the South Arabian Akk and Ash'ar, rallied behind another Umayyad candidate for the caliphate, Marwan I, while the Qahtan of Hims and Qays supported the anti-Umayyad Abd Allah ibn al-Zubayr of Mecca. At the Battle of Marj Rahit in 684, the Qahtan and Ansar of Hims joined the Qays tribal faction in opposition to the Umayyads and their tribal allies. The battle ended in a rout for the anti-Umayyad forces, but soon afterward the Qahtan, Quda'a, Kinda, Judham and others allied to form the Yaman (Yemeni) faction, in opposition to the Qays, who maintained their rebellion from the Jazira.

In the later Umayyad period, during and after the Third Fitna, the troops of Hims were ill-disposed to the dynasty. Upon hearing of the death of al-Walid II (r. 743–744), they refused to recognize his successor Yazid III (r. 744–744) and elected Mu'awiya ibn Yazid, a grandson of Husayn ibn Numayr of the Sakun clan of Kinda as their leader. Although Yazid put down the revolt, he offered the tribal nobility of Hims significant sums and appointed Mu'awiya ibn Yazid governor. After Yazid's death, the troops of Hims refused to accept the legitimacy of Caliph Ibrahim (r. 744–744) and rebelled against Caliph Marwan II (r. 744–750), though the household of Husayn ibn Numayr backed him.

== Governors ==
=== Rashidun period (638–661) ===
- Iyad ibn Ghanm al-Fihri (639–641)
- Sa'id ibn Amir ibn Hidhyam al-Jumahi (641–642)
- Umayr ibn Sa'd al-Ansari (642–646)
- Mu'awiya ibn Abi Sufyan (646–661)
  - Abd al-Rahman ibn Khalid ibn al-Walid (at least 653/654–666)

=== Umayyad period (661–750) ===
- Nu'man ibn Bashir al-Ansari (666–678; governed under Mu'awiya I)
- Malik ibn Hubayra al-Sakuni (undetermined period in 661–680; governed under Mu'awiya I)
- Husayn ibn Numayr al-Sakuni (680–683; governed under Caliph Yazid I)
- Nu'man ibn Bashir al-Ansari (684–684; governed under the Mecca-based claimant to the caliphate Abd Allah ibn al-Zubayr)
- Khalid ibn Yazid (684–685; son of Yazid I, governed under his Umayyad kinsman Caliph Marwan I)
  - Aban ibn al-Walid ibn Uqba (684–685; may have served as Khalid's deputy)
- Aban ibn al-Walid ibn Uqba (685–691; governed under his distant Umayyad kinsman Caliph Abd al-Malik)
- Abdallah ibn Abd al-Malik (c. 703–704)
- Al-Abbas ibn al-Walid (705–715)
- Yazid ibn Husayn ibn Numayr al-Sakuni (717–720)
- Abd al-Malik ibn Qa'qa ibn Khulayd al-Absi (undetermined period in 724–743)
- Marwan ibn Abdallah ibn Abd al-Malik and/or Uthman ibn al-Walid ibn Yazid (743–744)
- Mu'awiya ibn Yazid ibn Husayn al-Sakuni (744–745)
- Abd Allah ibn Shajara al-Kindi (745)
- Sa'id ibn Hisham ibn Abd al-Malik (745; rebel governor for Sulayman ibn Hisham)

=== Abbasid period ===
Abbasid rule in Syria started from 750 and it started declining after the 861. Abbasid rule in Syria completed ended in the Mid 10th-century.

- Abd Allah ibn Ali (750–753)
- Salih ibn Ali ibn Abd Allah ibn Abbas (756–757)
- Abd al-Malik ibn Salih (793–795)
- Ishaq ibn Sulayman ibn Ali ibn Abd Allah ibn Abbas (809)
- Abd Allah ibn Sa'id al-Harashi (809–810)
- Al-Mu'ayyad (854–855)
- Salih al-Abbasi al-Turki (855–856)

== See also ==
- the region of Syria
- Levant
- Mashriq

== Bibliography ==
- Blankinship, Khalid Yahya (1994). The End of the Jihâd State: The Reign of Hishām ibn ʻAbd al-Malik and the Collapse of the Umayyads. Albany, New York: State University of New York Press. ISBN 978-0-7914-1827-7.
- Crone, Patricia (1980). Slaves on Horses: The Evolution of the Islamic Polity. Cambridge: Cambridge University Press. ISBN 0-521-52940-9.
- Crone, Patricia (1994). "Were the Qays and Yemen of the Umayyad Period Political Parties?" (PDF). Der Islam. 71: 1–57. doi:10.1515/islm.1994.71.1.1. S2CID 154370527.
- Dixon, 'Abd al-Ameer 'Abd (August 1969). The Umayyad Caliphate 65–86/684–705: A Political Study (Thesis). University of London, School of Oriental and African Studies.
- Fishbein, Michael, ed. (1992). The History of al-Ṭabarī, Volume XXXI: The War Between Brothers: The Caliphate of Muḥammad al-Amīn, A.D. 809–813/A.H. 193–198. SUNY Series in Near Eastern Studies. Albany, New York: State University of New York Press. ISBN 978-0-7914-1085-1.
- Gundelfinger, Simon; Verkinderen, Peter (2020). "The Governors of al-Sham and Fars in the Early Islamic Empire - A Comparative Regional Perspective". In Hagemann, Hannah-Lena; Heidemann, Stefan (eds.). Elites — Connecting the Early Islamic Empire. Berlin: Walter de Gruyter. pp. 255–330. ISBN 978-3-11-066648-9.
- Hawting, G. R., ed. (1989). The History of al-Ṭabarī, Volume XX: The Collapse of Sufyānid Authority and the Coming of the Marwānids: The Caliphates of Muʿāwiyah II and Marwān I and the Beginning of the Caliphate of ʿAbd al-Malik, A.D. 683–685/A.H. 64–66. SUNY Series in Near Eastern Studies. Albany, New York: State University of New York Press. ISBN 978-0-88706-855-3.
- Humphreys, R. Stephen, ed. (1990). The History of al-Ṭabarī, Volume XV: The Crisis of the Early Caliphate: The Reign of ʿUthmān, A.D. 644–656/A.H. 24–35. SUNY Series in Near Eastern Studies. Albany, New York: State University of New York Press. ISBN 978-0-7914-0154-5.
- Hillenbrand, Carole, ed. (1989). The History of al-Ṭabarī, Volume XXVI: The Waning of the Umayyad Caliphate: Prelude to Revolution, A.D. 738–744/A.H. 121–126. SUNY Series in Near Eastern Studies. Albany, New York: State University of New York Press. ISBN 978-0-88706-810-2.
- Hinds, M. (1993). "Muʿāwiya I b. Abī Sufyān". In Bosworth, C. E.; van Donzel, E.; Heinrichs, W. P. & Pellat, Ch. (eds.). The Encyclopaedia of Islam, Second Edition. Volume VII: Mif–Naz. Leiden: E. J. Brill. pp. 263–268. ISBN 978-90-04-09419-2.
- Kennedy, Hugh (2001). The Armies of the Caliphs: Military and Society in the Early Islamic State. London and New York: Routledge. ISBN 0-415-25093-5.
- Kraemer, Joel L., ed. (1989). The History of al-Ṭabarī, Volume XXXIV: Incipient Decline: The Caliphates of al-Wāthiq, al-Mutawakkil and al-Muntaṣir, A.D. 841–863/A.H. 227–248. SUNY Series in Near Eastern Studies. Albany, New York: State University of New York Press. ISBN 978-0-88706-874-4.
- le Strange, Guy (1890). Palestine Under the Moslems: A Description of Syria and the Holy Land from A.D. 650 to 1500. London: Committee of the Palestine Exploration Fund. OCLC 1004386.
- Madelung, Wilferd (1986). "Apocalyptic Prophecies in Hims in the Umayyad Age". Journal of Semitic Studies. 31 (2): 141–185. doi:10.1093/jss/XXXI.2.141.
- McAuliffe, Jane Dammen, ed. (1995). The History of al-Ṭabarī, Volume XXVIII: The ʿAbbāsid Authority Affirmed: The Early Years of al-Mansūr, A.D. 753–763/A.H. 136–145. SUNY Series in Near Eastern Studies. Albany, New York: State University of New York Press. ISBN 978-0-7914-1895-6.
- Ritter, Hellmut (2013). The Ocean of the Soul: Men, the World and God in the Stories of Farīd al-Dīn Aṭṭar. Translated by John O'Kane. Leiden: Brill. ISBN 978-90-04-12068-6.
- Wellhausen, Julius (1927). The Arab Kingdom and Its Fall. Translated by Margaret Graham Weir. Calcutta: University of Calcutta. OCLC 752790641.
- Williams, John Alden, ed. (1985). The History of al-Ṭabarī, Volume XXVII: The ʿAbbāsid Revolution, A.D. 743–750/A.H. 126–132. SUNY Series in Near Eastern Studies. Albany, New York: State University of New York Press. ISBN 978-0-87395-884-4.
