= Safwan ibn Muattal =

Companion of Muhhamad

Ṣafwān ibn al-Muʿaṭṭal al-Sulamī (Arabic: صفوان بن المعطل السلمي; d. 638 or 679) was a sahabi (companion) of the Islamic prophet Muhammad and an Arab commander in the Muslim conquests. He was one of the first members of the Banu Sulaym to embrace Islam. He was accused, allegedly by the poet Abd-Allah ibn Ubayy, of having an affair with Muhammad's wife Aisha after the two became separated from a Medina-bound caravan. Later, Safwan became a commander and moved from Medina to Basra during the Muslim conquest of that region. Afterward, he took part in the military campaigns against the Byzantines in al-Jazira (Upper Mesopotamia) and Armenia, where he is said to have been slain. However, other reports mention that he died decades later as governor of Armenia.

== Life ==
=== Early life ===
Safwan ibn al-Mu'attal belonged to the Dhakwan clan of the large Banu Sulaym tribe. His year of birth is not recorded in the sources. Most of the Sulaym inhabited the al-Harrah region and many members of the Dhakwan lived in the city of Mecca where they maintained close ties with the Quraysh; Safwan was an exception among the Dhakwan and lived in Medina. He converted to Islam just prior to Muhammad's expedition to the al-Muraysi well in 627.

Safwan became the subject of a controversy following the expedition when he and Muhammad's wife Aisha became separated from the caravan returning to Medina. Rumors circulated that they had an illicit affair, but the allegations turned out to be false. Safwan blamed the well-known Arab poet Hassan ibn Thabit for spreading the rumor and is said to have struck him in the head with a sword out of anger. Hassan complained to Muhammad, who compensated him either by offering Hassan an Egyptian bride or a piece of land; in return, Sa'd ibn Ubadah, a prominent Muslim from Medina, made Hassan relinquish his demand for retribution against Safwan, who was essentially unpunished for his action. Historian Gautier H. A. Juynboll asserts that the veracity of the stories surrounding the alleged incident between Safwan, Aisha and Hassan ibn Thabit are "hard to establish; they may be no more than background embellishments of Safwan's role in the affair, assuming then that the tale is historically tenable".

=== Commander in Jazira and Armenia ===
After the Muslim conquest of Iraq, Safwan settled in the Arab military colony at Basra, in a neighborhood near the old market center of Mirbad. He became a commander in the Muslim conquests of al-Jazira (Upper Mesopotamia). According to Muslim historian al-Waqidi, in 639, Safwan commanded the left wing of Iyad ibn Ghanm's 5,000-strong army during the launch of a campaign to conquer al-Jazira; al-Waqidi further states that Khalid ibn al-Walid was part of Safwan's left wing, though other reports contradict this claim. When Iyad reached Harran, he dispatched Safwan and Habib ibn Maslama al-Fihri to subdue Samosata; after Safwan and Maslama captured several villages and forts in Samosata's vicinity, the townspeople negotiated terms of surrender with the Muslims guaranteeing their personal safety and no harm to their properties in exchange for a head tax and recognition of Muslim rule.

When Uthman became caliph in 644 he made Mu'awiyah governor of all Syria, Jazira and the frontier areas of these provinces. Uthman directed Mu'awiyah to continue the conquest of Shimshat in Armenia, a task which he delegated to Safwan and Habib ibn Maslama. The latter two camped around the city for a few days and forced its surrender under terms similar to the capitulation of Samosata; other reports mention that Mu'awiyah himself led this campaign with Safwan and Habib acting as lieutenants. In either case, Mu'awiyah appointed Safwan governor of Shimshat.

Later, Habib made a failed attempt to capture the Armenian fortress of Kamacha (Hisn Kamkh) from its Byzantine defenders; Safwan likewise failed in a subsequent assault against the fortress. However, in 678/79, Safwan's forces finally subdued Kamacha; a fellow member of the Sulaymi Dhakwan clan, Umayr ibn al-Hubab, played an integral role in Kamacha's capitulation. Reports vary widely regarding Safwan's year of death, with one mentioning that he died fighting in Armenia in 638, and other sources, including al-Waqidi, claiming that he died as governor of Armenia in 678/79.

== See also ==
- 7th century in Lebanon § Ṣaḥāba who have visited Lebanon

== Bibliography ==
- Al-Baladhuri (1916). Hitti, Philip Khuri (ed.). The Origins of the Islamic State, Volume 1. Columbia University, Longmans, Green & Co. p. 270.
- Lecker, M. (1997). "Sulaym". In Bosworth, C. E.; van Donzel, E.; Heinrichs, W. P.; Lecomte, G. (eds.). The Encyclopedia of Islam. Vol. IX, San–Sze (new ed.). Leiden and New York: Brill. pp. 817–818. ISBN 90-04-10422-4.
- Juynboll, G. H. A. (1995). "Ṣafwān ibn Muʿaṭṭal". In Bosworth, C. E.; van Donzel, E.; Heinrichs, W. P.; Lecomte, G. (eds.). The Encyclopedia of Islam. Vol. VIII, Ned–Sam (new ed.). Leiden and New York: Brill. pp. 819–820. ISBN 90-04-10422-4.
