= Umayr ibn Sa'd al-Ansari =

Companion of Muhammad

Governor of Jund Hims
- In office 642–646
- Monarchs: Umar (r. 634–644); Uthman (r. 644–656)
- Preceded by: Sa'id ibn Amir al-Jumahi
- Succeeded by: Mu'awiya ibn Abi Sufyan

Personal details
- Born: Medina

Umayr ibn Sa'd al-Ansari (Arabic: عُمَيْر بْن سَعْد الْأَنْصَارِيّ, romanized: ʿUmayr ibn Saʿd al-Anṣārī) was a companion of Muhammad. His father died when Umayr was young, leaving him and his mother poor and destitute. His mother eventually remarried to one of the richest men in Medina, Julas ibn Suwayd from the powerful tribe of al-Aws. When he was barely ten years old, Umayr became a Muslim and was known to frequent the mosque despite his young age. In 630 Muhammad announced his intention to lead an expedition to Tabuk against the Byzantine forces. He ordered the Muslims to make the necessary preparations.

Shortly before the army was due to set out, Umayr returned home after performing Salat in the mosque. He was surprised that his stepfather Julas was so slow in preparing for the expedition and at his delay in contributing. Umayr related what he had seen at the mosque - young men who had come to enlist in the army and were turned away because of insufficient means of transport. Julas' response was shocking:

"If Muhammad is true in claiming that he is a Prophet then we are all worse than donkeys."

Umayr could not believe what he had heard and was forced to choose between preserving his relationship with Julas and dealing with his treachery and hypocrisy. The choice was painful, but he went to the mosque and told Muhammad what he had heard from his stepfather. Muhammad then summoned Julas who denied the allegations against him, claiming his stepson had lied.

Umayr then prayed: "O Lord, send down a revelation on Your Prophet to verify what I have told him." As the companions turned to Umayr, they saw that Muhammad was inspired. Having received the revelation he recited:

يَحْلِفُونَ بِاللّهِ مَا قَالُواْ وَلَقَدْ قَالُواْ كَلِمَةَ الْكُفْرِ وَكَفَرُواْ بَعْدَ إِسْلاَمِهِمْ وَهَمُّواْ بِمَا لَمْ يَنَالُواْ وَمَا نَقَمُواْ إِلاَّ أَنْ أَغْنَاهُمُ اللّهُ وَرَسُولُهُ مِن فَضْلِهِ فَإِن يَتُوبُواْ يَكُ خَيْرًا لَّهُمْ وَإِن يَتَوَلَّوْا يُعَذِّبْهُمُ اللّهُ عَذَابًا أَلِيمًا فِي الدُّنْيَا وَالآخِرَةِ وَمَا لَهُمْ فِي الأَرْضِ مِن وَلِيٍّ وَلاَ نَصِيرٍ

"(The hypocrites) swear by God that they have said (nothing wrong); yet most certainly they have uttered a saying which is a denial of the truth, and have thus denied the truth after having professed their self-surrender to God; for they were aiming at something which was beyond their reach. And they could find no fault (with the Faith) save that God had enriched them and (caused) His Apostle to enrich them out of His bounty. Hence, if they repent, it will be for their own good; but if they turn away, God will cause them to suffer a grievous suffering in this world and in the life to come and they will find no helper on earth, and none to give them succour." (The Qur'an, Surah at-Tawbah, 9:74).

Julas turned to Muhammad and said, "I do repent. Umayr told the truth and I lied. I beseech God to accept my repentance". Julas reformed and was a faithful Muslim thereafter. Whenever Umayr was mentioned, Julas would say: "May God reward Umayr with goodness on my behalf. He certainly saved me from disbelief and preserved my neck from the fire of hell."

During the caliphate of Umar ibn al-Khattab, Umayr ibn Sa'd was appointed governor Homs, Syria. This was despite Umayr's position as head of a Muslim army traversing the Arabian Peninsula and the region of greater Syria. Umayr accepted the appointment as governor reluctantly, preferring nothing better than Jihad. He was still quite young, in his early twenties.

After the caliphate passed from Umar to Uthman, Umayr competed with Mu'awiya ibn Abi Sufyan for status but as a result of illness he eventually requested from Uthman to relive him from his duties as governor. Uthman approved the requested and Umayr's province was added to the lands under Mu'awiya.
