= Michael Meinecke =

German art historian (1941–1995)

Michael Meinecke (6 November 1941 – 10 January 1995) was a German art historian, archaeologist and Islamic studies scholar who was director of the Museum of Islamic Art in Berlin from 1988 to 1995.

== Life and work ==
Meinecke was born in Vienna but grew up in Istanbul after his father accepted a position as director and stage designer at the City Theatre. He attended the German School in Istanbul, graduating in 1959. He studied art history, archaeology and Islamic studies in Vienna and Hamburg, and graduated in 1968 with a dissertation on Faience decoration of Seljuk religious buildings in Asia Minor. During this time he also traveled widely in Turkey and Turkic Central Asia.

After graduation he joined the German Archaeological Institute in Cairo in 1969 and devoted himself to preserving architecturally and historically significant buildings in the old town, especially those from the Mamluk period. One result of this work was the extensive study that formed his professorial thesis in 1978: Mamluk architecture in Egypt and Syria. This preservation work included a 1980 collaboration on restoration of the 10th-century Fatimid Darb Qirmiz Quarter in Cairo, for which he was among the recipients of the 1983 Aga Khan Award for Architecture.

Meinecke taught at the University of Hamburg from 1977 to 1980, and during this period he was also a consultant for UNESCO. In 1979 he founded the Damascus branch of the German Archaeological Institute. Meinecke led several important excavations in the years that followed, including at Raqqa (in modern Syria), where the late eighth-century palace complex of Harun al-Rashid was excavated starting in 1982.

In 1988, Meinecke succeeded Klaus Brisch as director of the Museum of Islamic Art in Berlin-Dahlem. After the reunification of East and West Berlin and the merging of museum collections, Meinecke was appointed director of the reunited Museum for Islamic Art in 1992. In 1995, he suddenly collapsed on the stairs to his office and died. After Meinecke's death, his position as director was filled by Volkmar Enderlein, the longtime head of the Islamic collection of Museum Island.

== Selected works ==
=== Books ===
- German: Fayencedekorationen an seldschukischen Sakralbauten in Kleinasien (Faience decoration of Seljuk religious buildings in Asia Minor, 1976; dissertation 1968)
- German: Die mamlukische Architektur in Ägypten und Syrien (Mamluk architecture in Egypt and Syria, published 1993; professorial thesis 1978)
- Meinecke, M. (1992), Die mamlukische Architektur in Ägypten und Syrien (648/1250 bis 923/1517), Glückstadt, ISBN 387030071X
- Patterns of Stylistic Changes in Islamic Architecture: Local Traditions Versus Migrating Artists (New York University Press, 1996)

=== Articles ===
- "Raqqa on the Euphrates. Recent Excavations at the Residence of Harun er-Rashid". In Kerner, Susanne. The Near East in Antiquity. German Contributions to the Archaeology of Jordan, Palestine, Syria, Lebanon and Egypt II. Amman, 1991. pp. 17–32.
