= Sa'id ibn Amir al-Jumahi =

Companion (Sahabi) of Muhammad

Sa'id ibn Amir al-Jumahi (Arabic: سعيد بن عامر الجمحي, romanized: Saʿīd ibn ʿĀmir al-Jumaḥī) was a companion of the Islamic prophet Muhammad and governor of Hims in Syria during the caliphate of Umar (r. 634–644).

== Life ==
As a youth, he was among the thousands who left for Tanim on the outskirts of Mecca at the invitation of the Quraysh to witness the killing of Khubayb ibn Adi, a companion of Muhammad whom they had captured and whose death was to be in revenge for Quraysh losses in the Battle of Badr. After accepting Islam shortly following Khubayb's death, Sa'id migrated to Medina and attached himself to Muhammad, participating in the Battle of Khaybar and other engagements thereafter. After Muhammad's death in 632 he continued active service under his two successors, Abu Bakr and Umar, who both knew Sa'id for his honesty and piety and listened to his advice. Umar appointed him as governor of Hims in Syria.

He died in c. 640 in Raqqa while he was the governor of Qaysariyah.

== See also ==
- 7th century in Lebanon § Ṣaḥāba who have visited Lebanon
- List of Sahaba
