= Khalid ibn al-Walid =

Muslim general (died 642)

Khalid ibn al-Walid خالد ابن الوليد
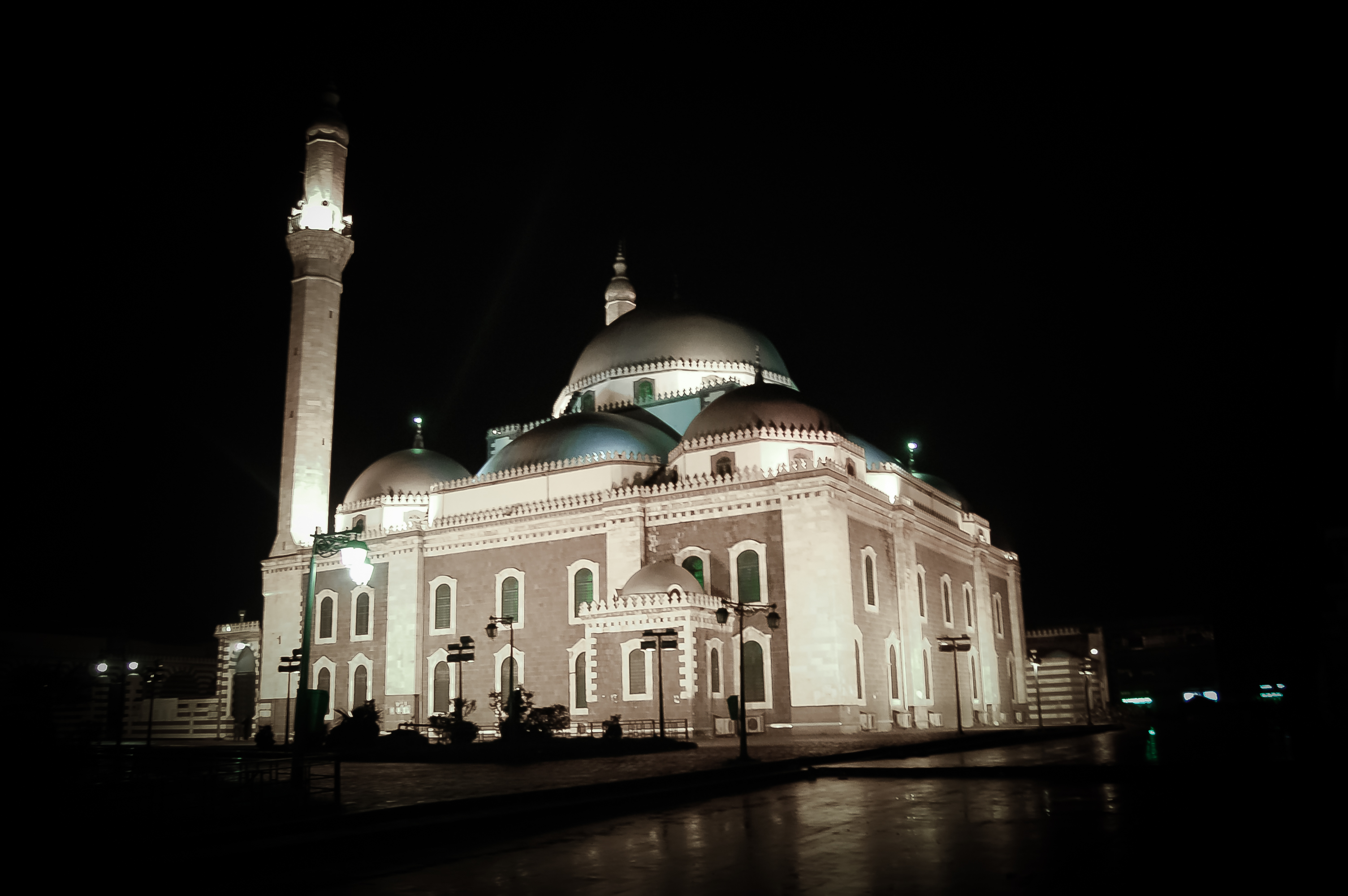
- The Khalid ibn al-Walid Mosque in Homs, Syria
- Born: Mecca, Arabia
- Died: c. 642 CE; Medina or Homs, Rashidun Caliphate
- Burial place: Khalid ibn al-Walid Mosque (Homs, Syria)
- Spouse(s): Asma bint Anas ibn Mudrik; Layla bint al-Minhal
- Children: Sulayman; Abd al-Rahman; Muhajir
- Relatives: Banu Makhzum (a clan of the Quraysh tribe)
- Military career
- Allegiance: Quraysh (625–627/629); Muhammad (627/629–632); Rashidun Caliphate (632–638)
- Branch: Rashidun army
- Service years: 629–638
- Commands: Field commander in Najd and the Yamama (632–633); Supreme commander of Muslim armies in Syria (634–636); Field commander in northern Syria (636–638); Military governor of Qinnasrin (c. 638)
- Conflicts: See list: Against Muslims: Battle of Uhud (625); Battle of the Trench (627); For Muslims: Battle of Mu'tah (629); Conquest of Mecca (630); Battle of Hunayn (630); Ridda Wars; Battle of Dhu al-Qassah (632); Battle of Buzakha (632); Battle of Ghamra (632); Battle of Zafar (632); Battle of al-Yamama (632); Early campaigns in Iraq; Battle of Dhat al-Salasil (633); Battle of the River (633); Battle of Ullais (633); Battle of Walaja (633); Battle of Hira (633); Battle of Dawmat al-Jandal (633); Siege of al-Anbar (633); Siege of Ayn al-Tamr (633); Battle of Firaz (634); Muslim conquest of Syria; Battle of Marj Rahit (634); Siege of Bosra (634); Battle of Ajnadayn (634); Battle of Fahl (634 or 635); Siege of Damascus (634); Battle of Marj al-Dibaj (634); Battle of Marj ar-Rum (635); Battle of Yarmuk (636); Siege of Emesa (637–638); Siege of Aleppo (637); Battle of Qinnasrin (637–638); Siege of Germanicia (638)
- Arabic name
- Personal (Ism): Khālid خالد
- Patronymic (Nasab): ibn al-Walīd ibn al-Mughīra ابن الوليد ابن المغيرة
- Teknonymic (Kunya): Abū Sulaymān أبو سليمان
- Epithet (Laqab): Sayf Allāh al-Maslūl (lit. "Unsheathed Sword of God") سيف الله المسلول
- Toponymic (Nisba): al-Makhzūmī المخزومي

Khalid ibn al-Walid ibn al-Mughira al-Makhzumi (Note: Arabic: خالد بن الوليد بن المغيرة المخزومي, romanized: Khālid ibn al-Walīd ibn al-Mughīra al-Makhzūmī) (died 642) was an Arab Muslim commander in the service of the Islamic prophet Muhammad and the Rashidun caliphs Abu Bakr (r. 632–634) and Umar (r. 634–644). He played the leading command role in the Ridda wars against rebel tribes in Arabia in 632–633, the initial campaigns in Sasanian Iraq in 633–634 and the conquest of Byzantine Syria in 634–638.

A horseman of the Quraysh tribe's aristocratic Makhzum clan, which ardently opposed Muhammad, Khalid played the instrumental role in defeating the Muslims at the Battle of Uhud in 625. Following his conversion to Islam in 627 or 629, he was made a commander by Muhammad, who bestowed on him the title Sayf Allah ('the Sword of God'). Khalid coordinated the safe withdrawal of Muslim troops during the abortive expedition to Mu'ta against the Arab allies of the Byzantines in 629 and led the Bedouin contingents of the Muslim army during the capture of Mecca and the Battle of Hunayn in c. 630. After Muhammad's death, Khalid was appointed to suppress or subjugate Arab tribes in Najd and the Yamama (both regions in central Arabia) opposed to the nascent Muslim state, defeating the rebel leaders Tulayha at the Battle of Buzakha in 632 and Musaylima at the Battle of Aqraba in 633.

Khalid subsequently moved against the largely Christian Arab tribes and the Sasanian Persian garrisons of the Euphrates valley in Iraq. He was reassigned by Abu Bakr to command the Muslim armies in Syria and he led his men there on an unconventional march across a long, waterless stretch of the Syrian Desert, boosting his reputation as a military strategist. As a result of decisive victories against the Byzantines at Ajnadayn (634), Fahl (634 or 635), Damascus (634–635) and Yarmouk (636), the Muslims under Khalid conquered most of Syria. He was afterward demoted from the high command by Umar. Khalid continued service as the key lieutenant of his successor Abu Ubayda ibn al-Jarrah in the sieges of Homs and Aleppo and the Battle of Qinnasrin, all in 637–638, which collectively precipitated the retreat from Syria of imperial Byzantine troops under Emperor Heraclius. Umar dismissed Khalid from his governorship of Qinnasrin afterward and he died in Medina or Homs in 642.

Khalid is generally considered by historians to be one of the most seasoned and accomplished generals in Islamic history, and he is likewise commemorated throughout the Arab world. Islamic tradition credits him with decisive battlefield tactics and effective leadership during the early Muslim conquests. However, historical accounts offer differing perspectives on certain events, including his execution of Malik ibn Nuwayra during the Ridda Wars and his dismissal from command by Umar. Khalid's military fame disturbed some pious early Muslims, most notably Umar, who feared it could develop into a personality cult. In Sunni tradition, Khalid is generally honored as a heroic figure, whereas Shia tradition portrays him more critically.

== Ancestry and early life ==
Khalid's father was al-Walid ibn al-Mughira, an arbitrator of local disputes in Mecca in the Hejaz (western Arabia). Al-Walid is identified by the historians Ibn Hisham (d. 833), Ibn Durayd (d. 837) and Ibn Habib (d. 859) as the "derider" of the Islamic prophet Muhammad mentioned in the Meccan suras (chapters) of the Qur'an. He belonged to the Banu Makhzum, a leading clan of the Quraysh tribe and Mecca's pre-Islamic aristocracy. The Makhzum introduced Meccan commerce to foreign markets, particularly Yemen and Abyssinia (Ethiopia), and developed a reputation among the Quraysh for their intellect, nobility and wealth. Their prominence was owed to the leadership of Khalid's paternal grandfather al-Mughira ibn Abd Allah. Khalid's paternal uncle Hisham was known as the 'lord of Mecca' and the date of his death was used by the Quraysh as the start of their calendar. The historian Muhammad Abdulhayy Shaban describes Khalid as "a man of considerable standing" within his clan and Mecca in general.

Khalid's mother was al-Asma bint al-Harith ibn Hazn, commonly known as Lubaba al-Sughra ('Lubaba the Younger', to distinguish her from her elder half-sister Lubaba al-Kubra) of the nomadic Banu Hilal tribe. Lubaba al-Sughra converted to Islam about c. 622 and her paternal half-sister Maymuna became a wife of Muhammad. She was also half-sister of Asma bint Umais, who successively married Ja'far ibn Abi Talib, Abu Bakr, and later Ali ibn Abi Talib. Through his maternal relations, Khalid became highly familiarized with the Bedouin (nomadic Arab) lifestyle. Descriptions of Khalid’s appearance are rare, but some accounts claim he so closely resembled Umar in both looks and voice that people with poor eyesight often confused them.

Genealogical tree of Khalid's clan, the Banu Makhzum

Al-Mughira
Hisham (d. 598)	Abu Rabi'a	Al-Walid (d. 622)	Fakih	Abu Umayya
Amr (Abu Jahl) (d. 624)	Al-Harith (d. 639)	Hantamah	Ayyash (d. 636)	Al-Walid (d. 620s)	Hisham	Khalid (d. 642)	Al-Muhajir (fl. 630–633)	Umm Salama (d. 680s)	Muhammad
Ikrima (d. 634 or 636)	Abd al-Rahman	Umar (d. 644)	Abd Allah	Isma'il	Abd al-Rahman (d. 666)	Muhajir (d. 657)
Salama	Hisham (fl. 691–706)	Khalid (fl. 669)	Khalid
Ayyub

== Early military career ==
=== Opposition to Muhammad ===
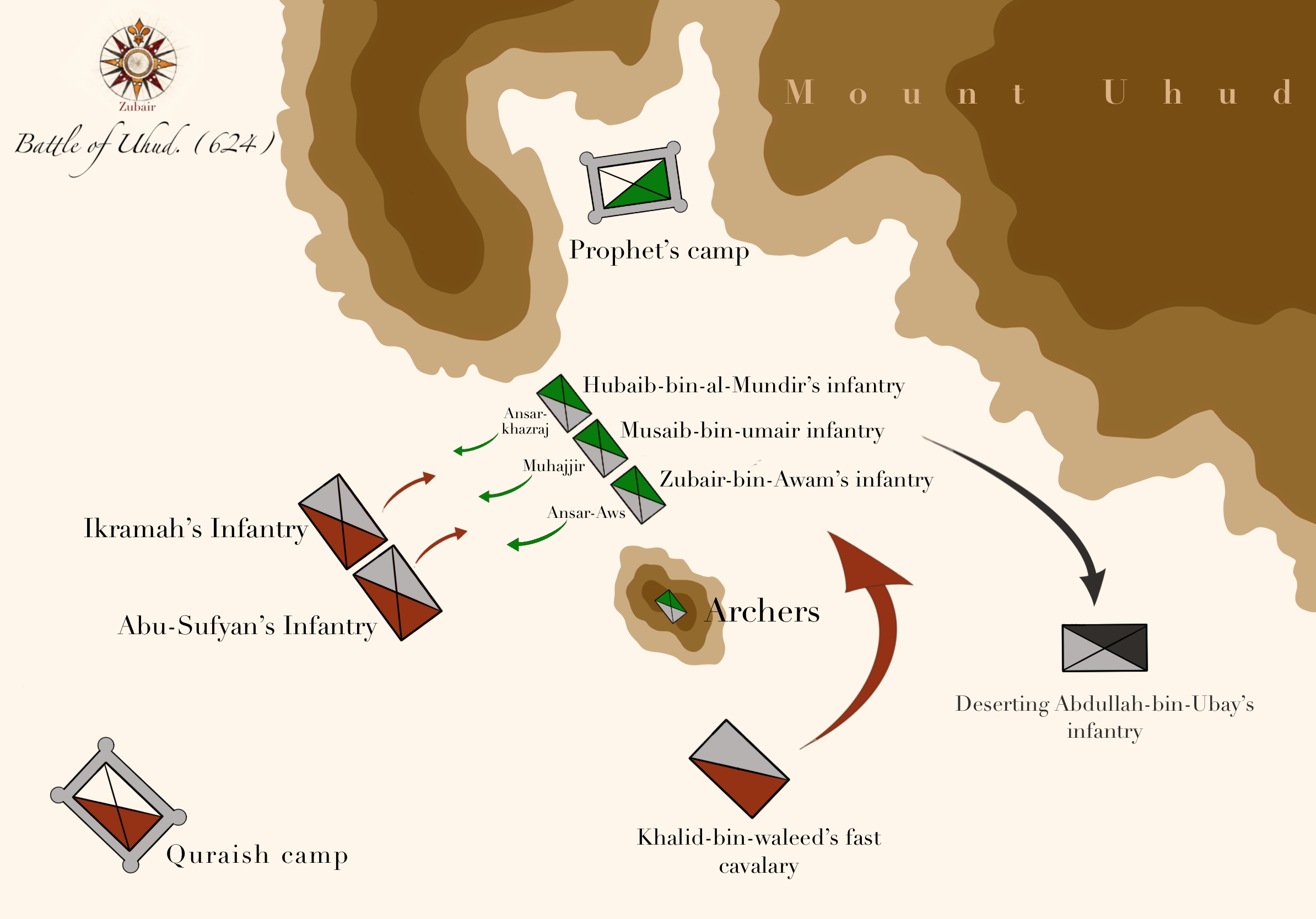
Map showing troop placements and maneuvers of the Battle of Uhud, where Khalid and his horsemen routed a Muslim force led by the Islamic prophet Muhammad in 625

The Makhzum were strongly opposed to Muhammad, and the clan's preeminent leader Amr ibn Hisham (Abu Jahl), Khalid's first cousin, organized the boycott of Muhammad's clan, the Banu Hashim of Quraysh, in c. 616–618. After Muhammad emigrated from Mecca to Medina in 622, the Makhzum under Abu Jahl commanded the war against him until they were routed at the Battle of Badr in 624. About twenty-five of Khalid's paternal cousins, including Abu Jahl, and numerous other kinsmen were slain in that engagement.

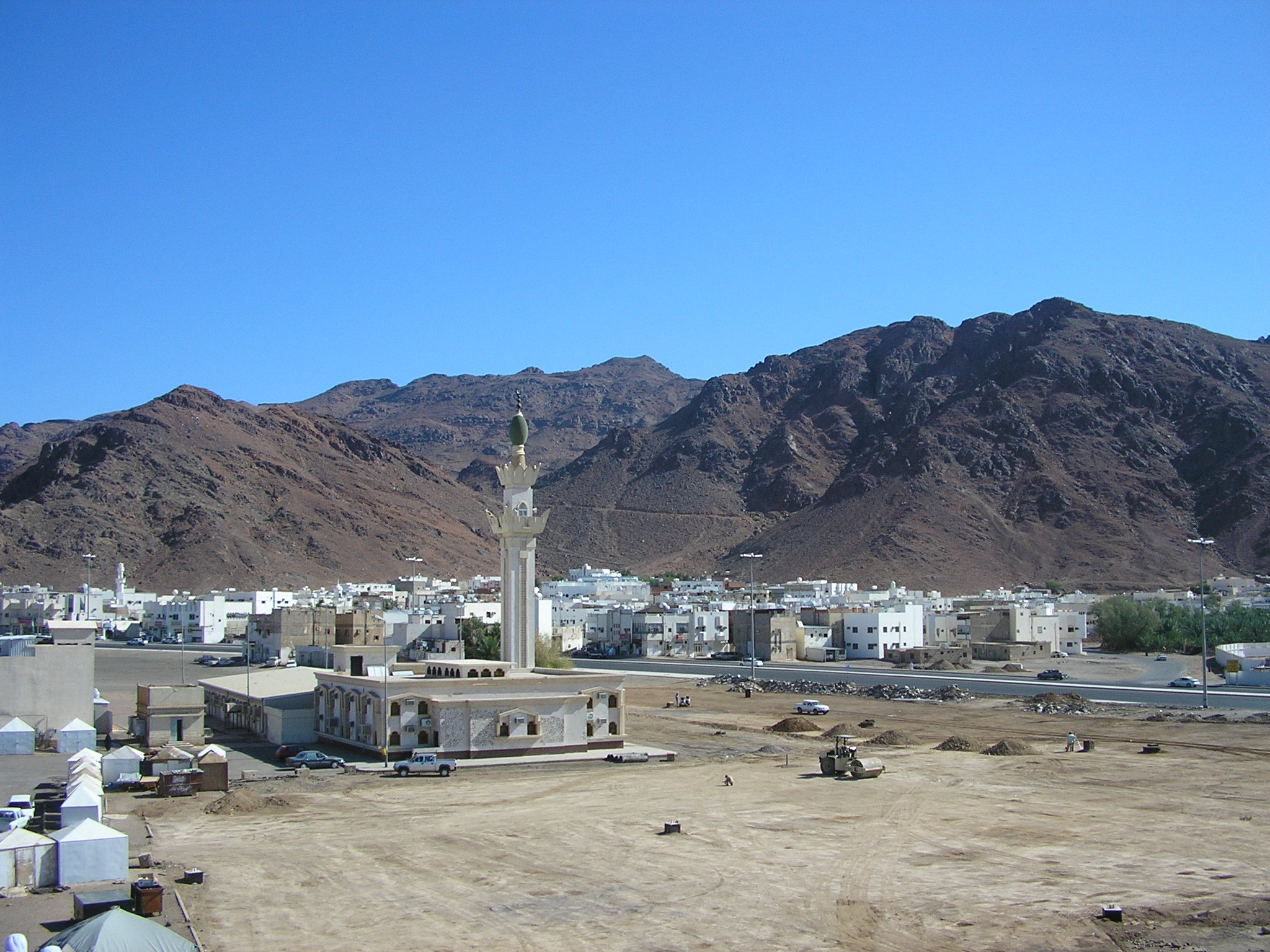
Mount Uhud (pictured in 2009) where the battle took place

The following year, Khalid commanded the right flank of the cavalry in the Meccan army which confronted Muhammad at the Battle of Uhud north of Medina. According to the historian Donald Routledge Hill, rather than launching a frontal assault against the Muslim lines on the slopes of Mount Uhud, "Khalid adopted the sound tactics" of going around the mountain and bypassing the Muslim flank. He advanced through the Wadi Qanat valley west of Uhud until being checked by Muslim archers south of the valley at Mount Ruma. The Muslims gained the early advantage in the fight, but after most of the Muslim archers abandoned their positions to join the raiding of the Meccans' camp, Khalid charged against the resulting break in the Muslims' rear defensive lines. In the ensuing rout, several dozen Muslims were killed. The narratives of the battle describe Khalid riding through the field, slaying the Muslims with his lance. Shaban credits Khalid's "military genius" for the Quraysh's victory at Uhud, the only engagement in which the tribe defeated Muhammad.

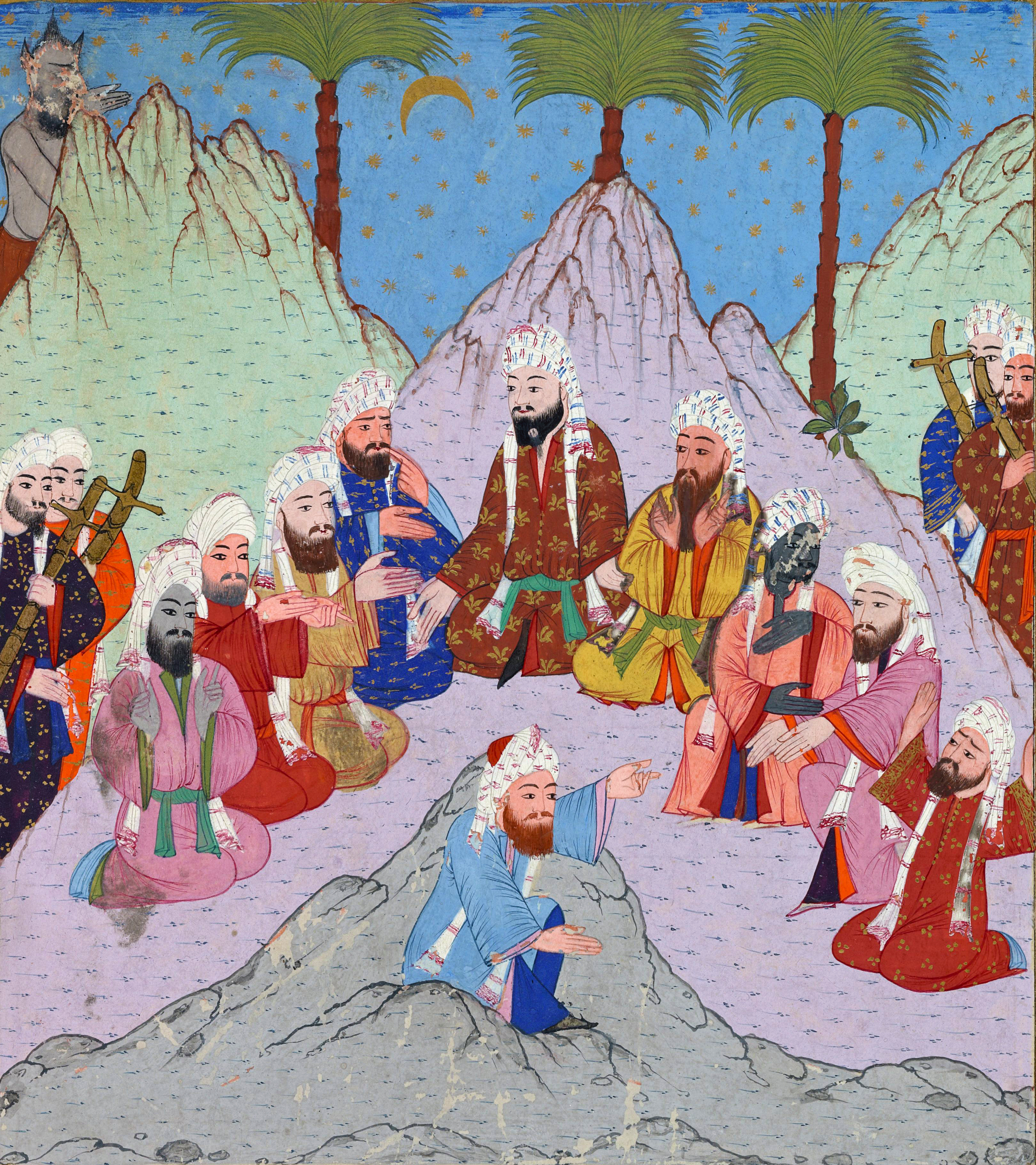
Islamic miniature of Iblis (top-left) watching over Khālid ibn al-Walīd and other Quraysh leaders discussing the second pledge at al-Aqabah, being spied on by the anti-Islamic zealot "the Monk" Abu ʿĀmir al-Rāhib.

In 628, Muhammad and his followers headed for Mecca to perform the umra (lesser pilgrimage to Mecca) and the Quraysh dispatched 200 cavalry to intercept him upon hearing of his departure. Khalid was at the head of the cavalry and Muhammad avoided confronting him by taking an unconventional and difficult alternate route, ultimately reaching Hudaybiyya at the edge of Mecca. Upon realizing Muhammad's change of course, Khalid withdrew to Mecca. A truce between the Muslims and the Quraysh was reached in the Treaty of Hudaybiyya in March.

=== Conversion to Islam and service under Muhammad ===
In the year 6 AH (c. 627) or 8 AH (c. 629) Khalid embraced Islam in Muhammad's presence alongside the Qurayshites Amr ibn al-As and Uthman ibn Talha; the modern historian Michael Lecker comments that the accounts holding that Khalid converted in 8 AH are "perhaps more trustworthy". The historian Akram Diya Umari holds that Khalid embraced Islam and relocated to Medina following the Treaty of Hudaybiyya, apparently after the Quraysh dropped demands for the extradition of newer Muslim converts to Mecca. Following his conversion, Khalid "began to devote all his considerable military talents to the support of the new Muslim state", in the words of the historian Hugh N. Kennedy.

Khalid participated in the expedition to Mu'tah in modern-day Jordan ordered by Muhammad in September 629. The purpose of the raid may have been to acquire booty in the wake of the Sasanian Persian army's retreat from Syria following its defeat by the Byzantine Empire in July. The Muslim detachment was routed by a Byzantine force consisting mostly of Arab tribesmen led by the Byzantine commander Theodore, and several high-ranking Muslim commanders were slain. Khalid took command of the army following the deaths of the appointed commanders and, with considerable difficulty, oversaw a safe withdrawal of the Muslims. Muhammad rewarded Khalid by bestowing on him the honorary title Sayf Allah ('the Sword of God') (Note: The time and place that Khalid gained the epithet Sayf Allah ('the Sword of God') varies in the Islamic sources. Historians of the 8th and early 9th centuries indicate the title was awarded to Khalid by Caliph Abu Bakr (r. 632–634) for his successes in the Ridda wars against the tribes of Arabia opposed to the Muslim state. In the mid-to-late 9th century, the first reports began to circulate in Islamic histories that Muhammad awarded the title to Khalid for his role against the Byzantines at the Battle of Mu'ta.) or Sayf Allah al-Maslul ('the Unsheathed Sword of God').

In December 629 or January 630, Khalid took part in Muhammad's conquest of Mecca, after which most of the Quraysh converted to Islam. In that campaign Khalid led a nomadic contingent called muhajirat al-arab ('the Bedouin emigrants'). He led one of the two main pushes into the city and in the subsequent fighting with the Quraysh, three of his men were killed while twelve Qurayshites were slain, according to Ibn Ishaq, the 8th-century biographer of Muhammad. Khalid commanded the Bedouin Banu Sulaym in the Muslims' vanguard at the Battle of Hunayn later that year. In that confrontation, the Muslims, boosted by the influx of Qurayshite converts, defeated the Thaqif—the Ta'if-based traditional rivals of the Quraysh—and their nomadic Hawazin allies. Khalid was then appointed to destroy the idol of al-Uzza, one of the goddesses worshiped in pre-Islamic Arabian religion, in the Nakhla area between Mecca and Ta'if.

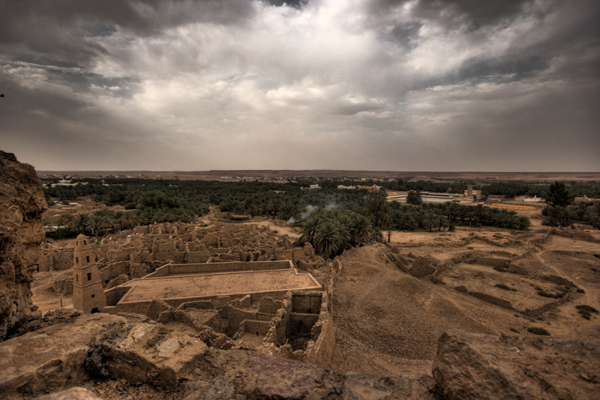
The oasis town of Dumat al-Jandal (pictured in 2007). Khalid led an expedition against the city in 630, and may have led another expedition in 633 or 634, though modern historians have cast doubt about the latter campaign or Khalid's role in it.

Khalid was afterward dispatched to invite the Banu Jadhima in Yalamlam, about 80 kilometers (50 mi) south of Mecca, to Islam, but according to traditional Islamic sources, he attacked the tribe without authorization. In the version of Ibn Ishaq, Khalid had persuaded the Jadhima tribesmen to disarm and embrace Islam, which he followed up by executing a number of the tribesmen in revenge for the Jadhima's slaying of his uncle Fakih ibn al-Mughira dating to before Khalid's conversion to Islam. In the narrative of Ibn Hajar al-Asqalani (d. 1449), Khalid misunderstood the tribesmen's acceptance of the faith as a rejection or denigration of Islam due to his unfamiliarity with the Jadhima's accent and consequently attacked them. In both versions, Muhammad declared himself innocent of Khalid's action but did not discharge or punish him. Despite the controversy, Muhammad’s trust in Khalid persisted. Shortly thereafter, he sent Khalid to investigate the Banu Mustaliq, a tribe related to the Banu Jadhima, following reports of their alleged apostasy. Khalid approached the task cautiously, confirmed the Banu Mustaliq’s adherence to Islam, and delivered an accurate report to Muhammad. This episode indicates that Khalid’s initial doubts about the Banu Jadhima’s religious commitment, despite their distinct clan affiliation, were not entirely baseless, as suspicions about related tribes resurfaced months later, prompting multiple delegations to investigate their status. According to the historian W. Montgomery Watt, the traditional account about the Jadhima incident "is hardly more than a circumstantial denigration of Khālid, and yields little solid historical fact".

Later in 630, while Muhammad was at Tabuk, he dispatched Khalid to capture the oasis market town of Dumat al-Jandal. Khalid gained its surrender and imposed a heavy penalty on the inhabitants of the town, one of whose chiefs, the Kindite Ukaydir ibn Abd al-Malik al-Sakuni, was ordered by Khalid to sign the capitulation treaty with Muhammad in Medina. In June 631 Khalid was sent by Muhammad at the head of 480 men to invite the mixed Christian and polytheistic Balharith tribe of Najran to embrace Islam. The tribe converted and Khalid instructed them in the Qur'an and Islamic laws before returning to Muhammad in Medina with a Balharith delegation.

== Commander in the Ridda wars ==
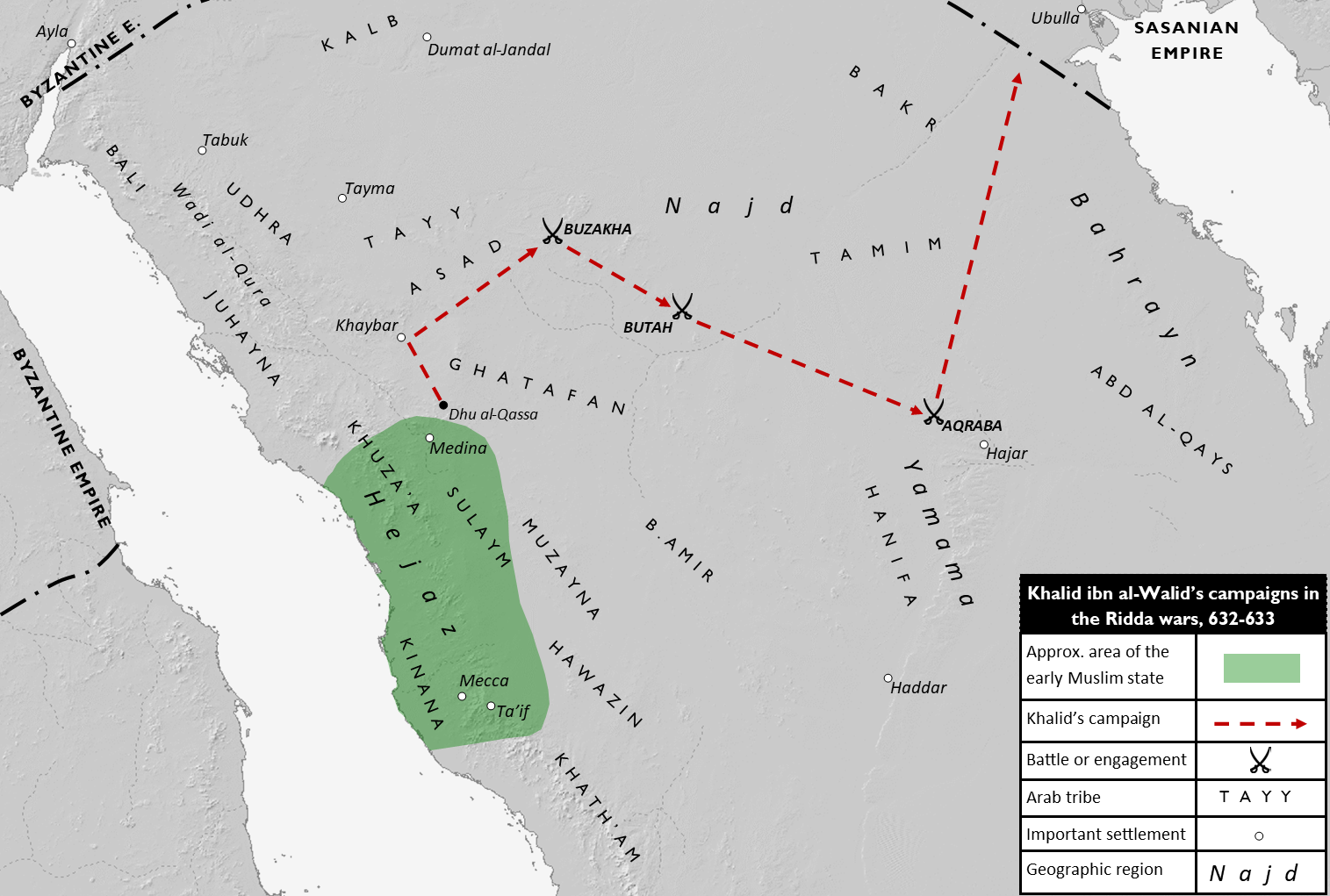
Map of Khalid's campaigns against the Arab tribes of Najd and the Yamama, both in central Arabia, during the Ridda wars. The itinerary of his campaign is indicated by dashed, red arrows. The territory of the early Muslim state, comprising Mecca, Medina and Ta'if and their environs, is shaded in green

After Muhammad's death in June 632, one of his early and close companions, Abu Bakr, became caliph (leader of the Muslim community). The issue of succession had caused discord among the Muslims. The Ansar (lit. 'Helpers'), the natives of Medina who hosted Muhammad after his emigration from Mecca, attempted to elect their own leader. Opinion was split among the Muhajirun (lit. 'Emigrants'), the mostly Qurayshite natives of Mecca who emigrated with Muhammad to Medina. One group advocated for a companion closer in kinship to Muhammad, namely his cousin Ali, while another group, backed by new converts among the Qurayshite aristocracy, rallied behind Abu Bakr. The latter, with the key intervention of the prominent Muhajirun, Umar ibn al-Khattab and Abu Ubayda ibn al-Jarrah, overrode the Ansar and acceded. Khalid was a staunch supporter of Abu Bakr's succession. A report preserved in a work by the 13th-century scholar Ibn Abi'l-Hadid claims that Khalid was a partisan of Abu Bakr, opposed Ali's candidacy, and declared that Abu Bakr was "not a man about whom one needs [to] enquire, and his character needs not be sounded out".

Most tribes in Arabia, except those inhabiting the environs of Mecca, Medina and Ta'if, discontinued their allegiance to the nascent Muslim state after Muhammad's death or had never established formal relations with Medina. Islamic historiography describes Abu Bakr's efforts to establish or reestablish Islamic rule over the tribes as the Ridda wars (wars against the 'apostates'). Views of the wars by modern historians vary considerably. Watt agrees with the Islamic characterization of the tribal opposition as anti-Islamic in nature, while Julius Wellhausen and C. H. Becker hold the tribes were opposed to the tax obligations to Medina rather than Islam as a religion. In the view of Leone Caetani and Bernard Lewis, the opposing tribes who had established ties with Medina regarded their religious and fiscal obligations as being a personal contract with Muhammad; their attempts to negotiate different terms after his death were rejected by Abu Bakr, who proceeded to launch the campaigns against them.

Of the six main conflict zones in Arabia during the Ridda wars, two were centered in Najd (the central Arabian plateau): the rebellion of the Asad, Tayy and Ghatafan tribes under Tulayha and the rebellion of the Tamim tribe led by Sajah; both leaders claimed to be prophets. After Abu Bakr quashed the threat to Medina by the Ghatafan at the Battle of Dhu al-Qassah, he dispatched Khalid against the rebel tribes in Najd. (Note: Abu Bakr had previously dispatched the bulk of the Muslim army, under Usama ibn Zayd, to attack Byzantine Syria, despite threats to the Muslim towns of the Hejaz by nomadic tribes which had discarded Muslim authority. The historian Elias Shoufani contends that Usama's expedition was a much smaller force than had been originally planned by the Islamic prophet Muhammad and doubts its ranks comprised most of the Ansar, Muhajirun, and the Bedouin tribesmen of the Mecca and Medina areas; rather, it probably consisted mainly of poorer, brigand-types among the Muslims who depended on booty from raids for sustenance. Lecker holds that Khalid was deployed against the tribes in Najd before the return of Usama's army, while Watt notes Khalid was sent with a large army after Usama's return.) Khalid was Abu Bakr's third nominee to lead the campaign after his first two choices, Zayd ibn al-Khattab and Abu Hudhayfa ibn Utba, refused the assignment. His forces were drawn from the Muhajirun and the Ansar. Throughout the campaign, Khalid demonstrated considerable operational independence and did not stringently abide by the caliph's directives. In the words of Shaban, "he simply defeated whoever was there to be defeated".

=== Battle of Buzakha ===
Khalid's initial focus was the suppression of Tulayha's following. In late 632, he confronted Tulayha's forces at the Battle of Buzakha, which took place at the eponymous well in Asad territory where the tribes were encamped. The Tayy defected to the Muslims before Khalid's troops arrived to Buzakha, the result of mediation between the two sides by the Tayy chief Adi ibn Hatim. The latter had been assigned by Medina to collect taxes from his tribe and its traditional Asad rivals.

Khalid bested the Asad-Ghatafan forces in battle. When Tulayha appeared close to defeat, the Fazara section of the Ghatafan under their chief Uyayna ibn Hisn deserted the field, compelling Tulayha to flee for Syria. His tribe, the Asad, subsequently submitted to Khalid, followed by the hitherto neutral Banu Amir, which had awaited the results of the conflict before giving its allegiance to either side. Uyayna was captured and brought to Medina. As a result of the victory at Buzakha, the Muslims gained control over most of Najd.

=== Execution of Malik ibn Nuwayra ===
After Buzakha, Khalid proceeded against the rebel Tamimite chieftain Malik ibn Nuwayra headquartered in al-Butah, in the present-day Qassim region. Malik had been appointed by Muhammad as the collector of the sadaqa ('alms tax') over his clan of the Tamim, the Yarbu, but stopped forwarding this tax to Medina after Muhammad's death. Abu Bakr consequently resolved to have him executed by Khalid. The latter faced divisions within his army regarding this campaign, with the Ansar initially staying behind, citing instructions by Abu Bakr not to campaign further until receiving a direct order by the caliph. Khalid claimed such an order was his prerogative as the commander appointed by the caliph, but he did not force the Ansar to participate and continued his march with troops from the Muhajirun and the Bedouin defectors from Buzakha and its aftermath; the Ansar ultimately rejoined Khalid after internal deliberations.

According to the most common account in the Muslim traditional sources, Khalid's army encountered Malik and eleven of his clansmen from the Yarbu in 632. The Yarbu did not resist, proclaimed their Muslim faith and were escorted to Khalid's camp. Khalid had them all executed over the objection of an Ansarite, who had been among the captors of the tribesmen and argued for the captives' inviolability due to their testaments as Muslims. Afterward, Khalid married Malik's widow Umm Tamim bint al-Minhal. When news of Khalid's actions reached Medina, Umar, who had become Abu Bakr's chief aide, pressed for Khalid to be punished or relieved of command, but Abu Bakr pardoned him.

According to the account of the 8th-century historian Sayf ibn Umar, Malik had also been cooperating with the prophetess Sajah, his kinswoman from the Yarbu, but after they were defeated by rival clans from the Tamim, left her cause and retreated to his camp at al-Butah. There, he was encountered with his small party by the Muslims. The modern historian Wilferd Madelung discounts Sayf's version, asserting that Umar and other Muslims would not have protested Khalid's execution of Malik if the latter had left Islam. In an authentic narrative from the accounts of Ibn Khallikan and at-Tabari, Malik refused to pay zakah while agreeing to pray, leading Khalid to argue that prayer and zakah are inseparable in Islam. When Malik referred to Muhammad as “your companion,” implying disassociation, Khalid deemed it apostasy, questioned Malik’s loyalty, and ordered his execution after the argument escalated. Watt considers accounts about the Tamim during the Ridda in general to be "obscure ... partly because the enemies of Khālid b. al-Walīd have twisted the stories to blacken him". In the view of the modern historian Ella Landau-Tasseron, "the truth behind Malik's career and death will remain buried under a heap of conflicting traditions".

=== Elimination of Musaylima and conquest of the Yamama ===
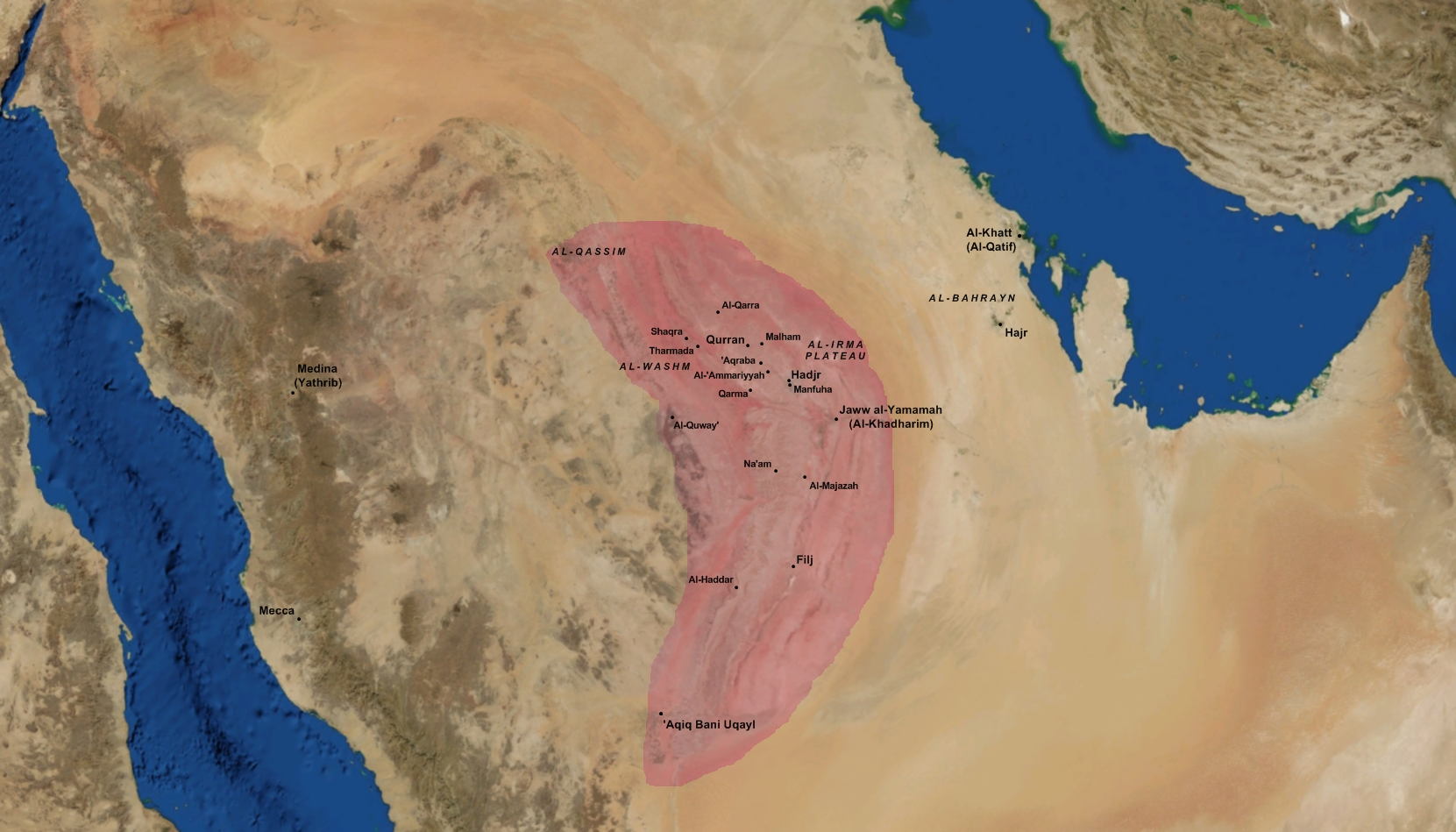
Map of the Yamama region, shaded in red. The region was conquered by Khalid from the Banu Hanifa tribe led by Musaylima

Following a series of setbacks in her conflict with rival Tamim factions, Sajah joined the strongest opponent of the Muslims: Musaylima, the leader of the sedentary Banu Hanifa tribe in the Yamama, the agricultural eastern borderlands of Najd. Musaylima had laid claims to prophet-hood before Muhammad's emigration from Mecca, and his entreaties for Muhammad to mutually recognize his divine revelation were rejected by Muhammad. After Muhammad died, support for Musaylima surged in the Yamama, whose strategic value lay not only with its abundance of wheat fields and date palms, but also its location connecting Medina to the regions of Bahrayn and Oman in eastern Arabia. Abu Bakr had dispatched Shurahbil ibn Hasana and Khalid's cousin Ikrima with an army to reinforce the Muslim governor in the Yamama, Musaylima's tribal kinsman Thumama ibn Uthal. According to the modern historian Meir Jacob Kister, it was likely the threat posed by this army which compelled Musaylima to forge an alliance with Sajah. Ikrima was repelled by Musaylima's forces and thereafter instructed by Abu Bakr to quell rebellions in Oman and Mahra (central southern Arabia) while Shurahbil was to remain in the Yamama in expectation of Khalid's large army.

After his victories against the Bedouin of Najd, Khalid headed to the Yamama with warnings of the Hanifa's military prowess and instructions by Abu Bakr to act severely toward the tribe should he be victorious. The 12th-century historian Ibn Hubaysh al-Asadi holds that the armies of Khalid and Musaylima respectively stood at 4,500 and 4,000. Kister dismisses the much larger figures cited by most of the early Muslim sources as exaggerations. Khalid's first three assaults against Musaylima at the plain of Aqraba were beaten back. The strength of Musaylima's warriors, the superiority of their swords and the fickleness of the Bedouin contingents in Khalid's ranks were all reasons cited by the Muslims for their initial failures. Khalid heeded the counsel of the Ansarite Thabit ibn Qays to exclude the Bedouins from the next fight.

In the fourth assault against the Hanifa, the Muhajirun under Khalid and the Ansar under Thabit killed a lieutenant of Musaylima, who subsequently fled with part of his army. The Muslims pursued the Hanifa to a large enclosed garden which Musaylima used to stage a last stand against the Muslims. The enclosure was stormed by the Muslims, Musaylima was slain and most of the Hanifites were killed or wounded. The enclosure became known as the 'garden of death' for the high casualties suffered by both sides.

Khalid assigned a Hanifite taken captive early in the campaign, Mujja'a ibn al-Murara, to assess the strength, morale and intentions of the Hanifa in their Yamama fortresses in the aftermath of Musaylima's slaying. Mujja'a had the women and children of the tribe dress and pose as men at the openings of the forts in a ruse to boost their leverage with Khalid; he relayed to Khalid that the Hanifa still counted numerous warriors determined to continue the fight against the Muslims. This assessment, along with the exhaustion of his own troops, compelled Khalid to accept Mujja'a's counsel for a ceasefire with the Hanifa, despite Abu Bakr's directives to pursue retreating Hanifites and execute Hanifite prisoners of war.

Khalid's terms with the Hanifa entailed the tribe's conversion to Islam and the surrender of their arms and armor and stockpiles of gold and silver. Abu Bakr ratified the treaty, though he remained opposed to Khalid's concessions and warned that the Hanifa would remain eternally faithful to Musaylima. The treaty was further consecrated by Khalid's marriage to Mujja'a's daughter. According to Lecker, Mujja'a's ruse may have been invented by the Islamic tradition "in order to protect Khalid's policy because the negotiated treaty ... caused the Muslims great losses". Khalid was allotted an orchard and a field in each village included in the treaty with the Hanifa, while the villages excluded from the treaty were subject to punitive measures. Among these villages were Musaylima's hometown al-Haddar and Mar'at, whose inhabitants were expelled or enslaved and the villages resettled with tribesmen from clans of the Tamim.

=== Conclusion of the Ridda wars ===
The traditional sources place the final suppression of the Arab tribes of the Ridda wars before March 633, though Caetani insists the campaigns must have continued into 634. The tribes in Bahrayn may have resisted the Muslims until the middle of 634. A number of the early Islamic sources ascribe a role for Khalid on the Bahrayn front after his victory over the Hanifa. Shoufani deems this improbable, while allowing the possibility that Khalid had earlier sent detachments from his army to reinforce the main Muslim commander in Bahrayn, al-Ala al-Hadhrami.

The Muslim war efforts, in which Khalid played a vital part, secured Medina's dominance over the strong tribes of Arabia, which sought to diminish Islamic authority in the peninsula, and restored the nascent Muslim state's prestige. According to Lecker, Khalid and the other Qurayshite generals "gained precious experience [during the Ridda wars] in mobilizing large multi-tribal armies over long distances" and "benefited from the close acquaintance of the Kuraysh [sic] with tribal politics throughout Arabia".

== Campaigns in Iraq ==
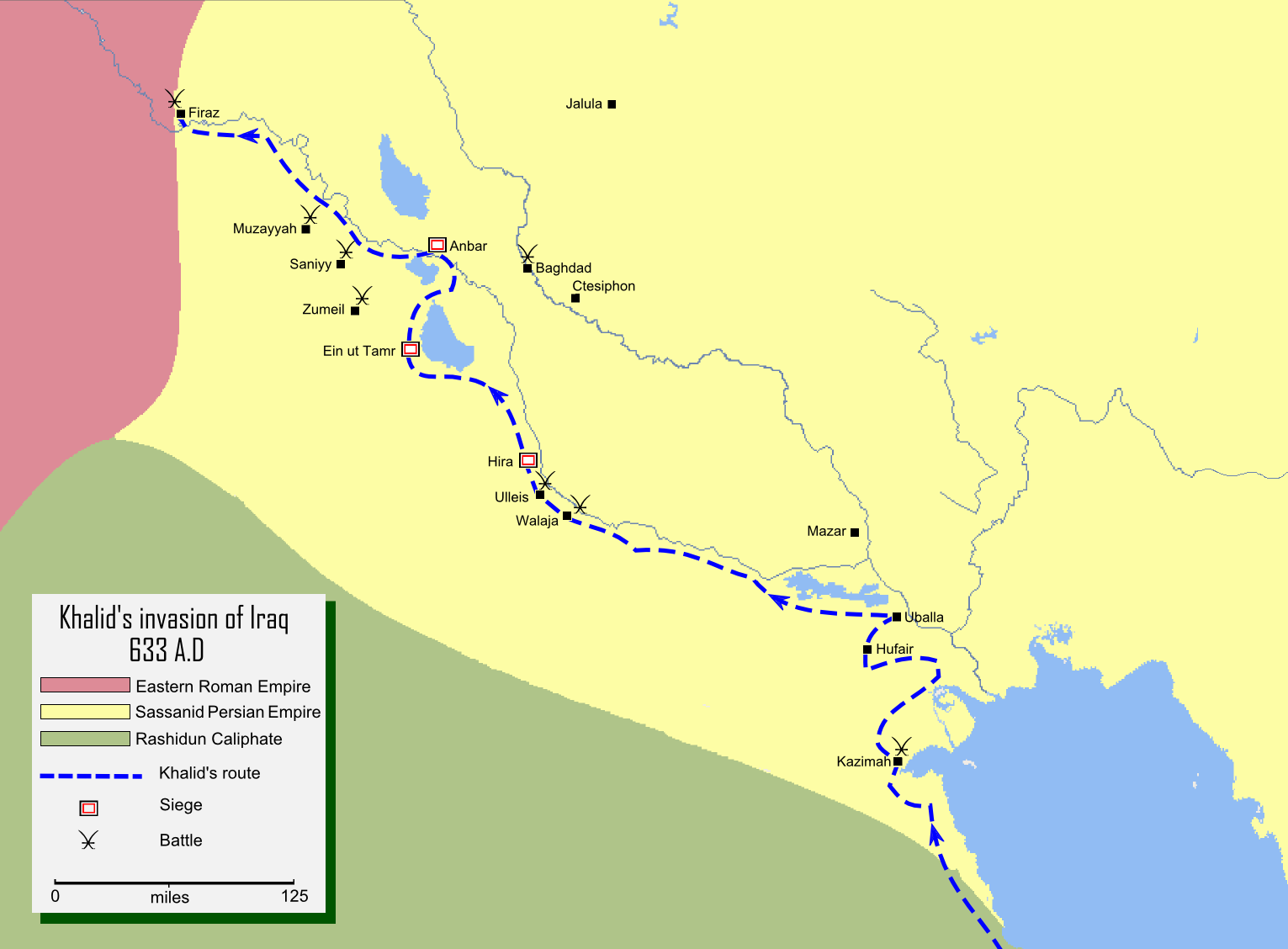
Map detailing Khalid's campaigns in Sasanian Iraq (lower Mesopotamia), based on the general outlines of the Islamic tradition

With the Yamama pacified, Khalid marched northward toward Sasanian territory in Iraq (lower Mesopotamia). He reorganized his army, possibly because the bulk of the Muhajirun may have withdrawn to Medina. According to the historian Khalil Athamina, the remnants of Khalid's army consisted of nomadic Arabs from Medina's environs whose chiefs were appointed to replace the vacant command posts left by the sahaba ('companions' of Muhammad). The historian Fred Donner holds that the Muhajirun and the Ansar still formed the core of his army, along with a large proportion of nomadic Arabs likely from the Muzayna, Tayy, Tamim, Asad and Ghatafan tribes. The commanders of the tribal contingents appointed by Khalid were Adi ibn Hatim of the Tayy and Asim ibn Amr of the Tamim. He arrived at the southern Iraqi frontier with about 1,000 warriors in the late spring or early summer of 633.

The focus of Khalid's offensive was the western banks of the Euphrates river and the nomadic Arabs who dwelt there. The details of the campaign's itinerary are inconsistent in the early Muslim sources, though Donner asserts that "the general course of Khalid's progress in the first part of his campaigning in Iraq can be quite clearly traced". The 9th-century histories of al-Baladhuri and Khalifa ibn Khayyat hold Khalid's first major battle in Iraq was his victory over the Sasanian garrison at Ubulla (the ancient Apologos, near modern Basra) and the nearby village of Khurayba, though al-Tabari (d. 923) considers attribution of the victory to Khalid as erroneous and that Ubulla was conquered later by Utba ibn Ghazwan al-Mazini. Donner accepts the town's conquest by Utba "somewhat later than 634" is the more likely scenario, though the historian Khalid Yahya Blankinship argues "Khālid at least may have led a raid there although [Utbah] actually reduced the area".

From Ubulla's vicinity, Khalid marched up the western bank of the Euphrates where he clashed with the small Sasanian garrisons who guarded the Iraqi frontier from nomadic incursions. The clashes occurred at Dhat al-Salasil, Nahr al-Mar'a (a canal connecting the Euphrates with the Tigris immediately north of Ubulla), Madhar (a town several days north of Ubulla), Ullays (likely the ancient trade center of Vologesias) and Walaja. The last two places were in the vicinity of al-Hira, a predominantly Arab market town and the Sasanian administrative center for the middle Euphrates valley.

Al-Hira's capture was the most significant gain of Khalid's campaign. After besting the city's Persian cavalry under the commander Azadhbih in minor clashes, Khalid and part of his army entered the unwalled city. Al-Hira's Arab tribal nobles, many of whom were Nestorian Christians with blood ties to the nomadic tribes on the city's western desert fringes, barricaded in their scattered fortified palaces. In the meantime, the other part of Khalid's army harried the villages in al-Hira's orbit, many of which were captured or capitulated on tributary terms with the Muslims. The Arab nobility of al-Hira surrendered in an agreement with Khalid whereby the city paid a tribute in return for assurances that al-Hira's churches and palaces would not be disturbed. The annual sum to be paid by al-Hira amounted to 60,000 or 90,000 silver dirhams, which Khalid forwarded to Medina, marking the first tribute the Caliphate received from Iraq.

During the engagements in and around al-Hira, Khalid received key assistance from al-Muthanna ibn Haritha and his Shayban tribe, who had been raiding this frontier for a considerable period before Khalid's arrival, though it is not clear if al-Muthanna's earlier activities were linked to the nascent Muslim state. After Khalid departed, he left al-Muthanna in practical control of al-Hira and its vicinity. He received similar assistance from the Sadus clan of the Dhuhl tribe under Qutba ibn Qatada and the Ijl tribe under al-Madh'ur ibn Adi during the engagements at Ubulla and Walaja. None of these tribes, all of which were branches of the Banu Bakr confederation, joined Khalid when he operated outside of their tribal areas.

Khalid continued northward along the Euphrates valley, attacking Anbar on the east bank of the river, where he secured capitulation terms from its Sasanian commander. Afterward, he plundered the surrounding market villages frequented by tribesmen from the Bakr and Quda'a confederations, before moving against Ayn al-Tamr, an oasis town west of the Euphrates and about 90 kilometers (56 mi) south of Anbar. Khalid encountered stiff resistance there by the tribesmen of the Namir, compelling him to besiege the town's fortress. The Namir were led by Hilal ibn Aqqa, a Christian chieftain allied with the Sasanians, who Khalid had crucified after defeating him. Ayn al-Tamr capitulated and Khalid captured the town of Sandawda to the north. By this stage, Khalid had subjugated the western areas of the lower Euphrates and the nomadic tribes which resided there, including the Namir, Taghlib, Iyad, Taymallat and most of the Ijl, as well as the settled Arab tribesmen.

=== Modern assessments ===
Athamina doubts the Islamic traditional narrative that Abu Bakr directed Khalid to launch a campaign in Iraq, citing Abu Bakr's disinterest in Iraq at a time when the Muslim state's energies were focused principally on the conquest of Syria. Unlike Syria, Iraq had not been the focus of Muhammad's or the early Muslims' ambitions, nor did the Quraysh maintain trading interests in the region dating to the pre-Islamic period as they had in Syria. According to Shaban, it is unclear if Khalid requested or received Abu Bakr's sanction to raid Iraq or ignored objections by the caliph. Athamina notes hints in the traditional sources that Khalid initiated the campaign unilaterally, implying that the return of the Muhajirun in Khalid's ranks to Medina following Musaylima's defeat likely represented their protest of Khalid's ambitions in Iraq. Shaban holds that the tribesmen who remained in Khalid's army were motivated by the prospect of war booty, particularly amid an economic crisis in Arabia which had arisen in the aftermath of the Ridda campaigns.

According to Donner, the subjugation of Arab tribes may have been Khalid's primary goal in Iraq and clashes with Persian troops were the inevitable, if incidental, result of the tribes' alignment with the Sasanian Empire. In Kennedy's view, Khalid's push toward the desert frontier of Iraq was "a natural continuation of his work" subduing the tribes of northeastern Arabia and in line with Medina's policy to bring all nomadic Arab tribes under its authority. Madelung asserts Abu Bakr relied on the Qurayshite aristocracy during the Ridda wars and early Muslim conquests and speculates that the caliph dispatched Khalid to Iraq to allot the Makhzum an interest in that region.

The extent of Khalid's role in the conquest of Iraq is disputed by modern historians. Patricia Crone argues it is unlikely Khalid played any role on the Iraqi front, citing seeming contradictions by contemporary, non-Arabic sources, namely the Armenian chronicle of Sebeos (c. 661) and the Khuzistan Chronicle (c. 680). The former only records Arab armies being sent to conquer Iraq as the Muslim conquest of Syria was already underway—as opposed to before as held by the traditional Islamic sources—while the latter mentions Khalid as the conqueror of Syria only. Crone views the traditional reports as part of a general theme in the largely Iraq-based, Abbasid-era (post-750) sources to diminish the early Muslims' focus on Syria in favor of Iraq. Crone's assessment is considered a "radical critique of the [traditional] sources" by R. Stephen Humphreys, while Blankinship calls it "too one-sided ... The fact that Khālid is a major hero in the historical traditions of Iraq certainly suggests ties there that can have come only from his early participation in its conquest".

== March to Syria ==
All early Islamic accounts agree that Khalid was ordered by Abu Bakr to leave Iraq for Syria to support Muslim forces already present there. Most of these accounts hold that the caliph's order was prompted by requests for reinforcements by the Muslim commanders in Syria. Khalid likely began his march to Syria in early April 634. He left small Muslim garrisons in the conquered cities of Iraq under the overall military command of al-Muthanna ibn Haritha.

The chronological sequence of events after Khalid's operations in Ayn al-Tamr is inconsistent and confused. According to Donner, Khalid undertook two further principal operations before embarking on his march to Syria, which have often been conflated by the sources with events that occurred during the march. One of the operations was against Dumat al-Jandal and the other against the Namir and Taghlib tribes present along the western banks of the upper Euphrates valley as far as the Balikh tributary and the Jabal al-Bishri mountains northeast of Palmyra. It is unclear which engagement occurred first, though both were Muslim efforts to bring the mostly nomadic Arab tribes of north Arabia and the Syrian steppe under Medina's control.

In the Dumat al-Jandal campaign, Khalid was instructed by Abu Bakr or requested by one of the commanders of the campaign, al-Walid ibn Uqba, to reinforce the lead commander Iyad ibn Ghanm's faltering siege of the oasis town. Its defenders were backed by their nomadic allies from the Byzantine-confederate tribes, the Ghassanids, Tanukhids, Salihids, Bahra and Banu Kalb. Khalid left Ayn al-Tamr for Dumat al-Jandal where the combined Muslim forces bested the defenders in a pitched battle. Afterward, Khalid executed the town's Kindite leader Ukaydir, who had defected from Medina following Muhammad's death, while the Kalbite chief Wadi'a was spared after the intercession of his Tamimite allies in the Muslims' camp.

The historians Michael Jan de Goeje and Caetani dismiss altogether that Khalid led an expedition to Dumat al-Jandal following his Iraqi campaign and that the city mentioned in the traditional sources was likely the town by the same name near al-Hira. The historian Laura Veccia Vaglieri calls their assessment "logical" and writes that "it seems impossible that Khālid could have made such a detour which would have taken him so far out of his way while delaying the accomplishment of his mission [to join the Muslim armies in Syria]". Vaglieri surmises that the oasis was conquered by Iyad ibn Ghanm or possibly Amr ibn al-As as the latter had been previously tasked during the Ridda wars with suppressing Wadi'a, who had barricaded himself in Dumat al-Jandal. Crone, dismissing Khalid's role in Iraq entirely, asserts that Khalid had definitively captured Dumat al-Jandal in the 631 campaign and from there crossed the desert to engage in the Syrian conquest.

=== Itineraries and the desert march ===
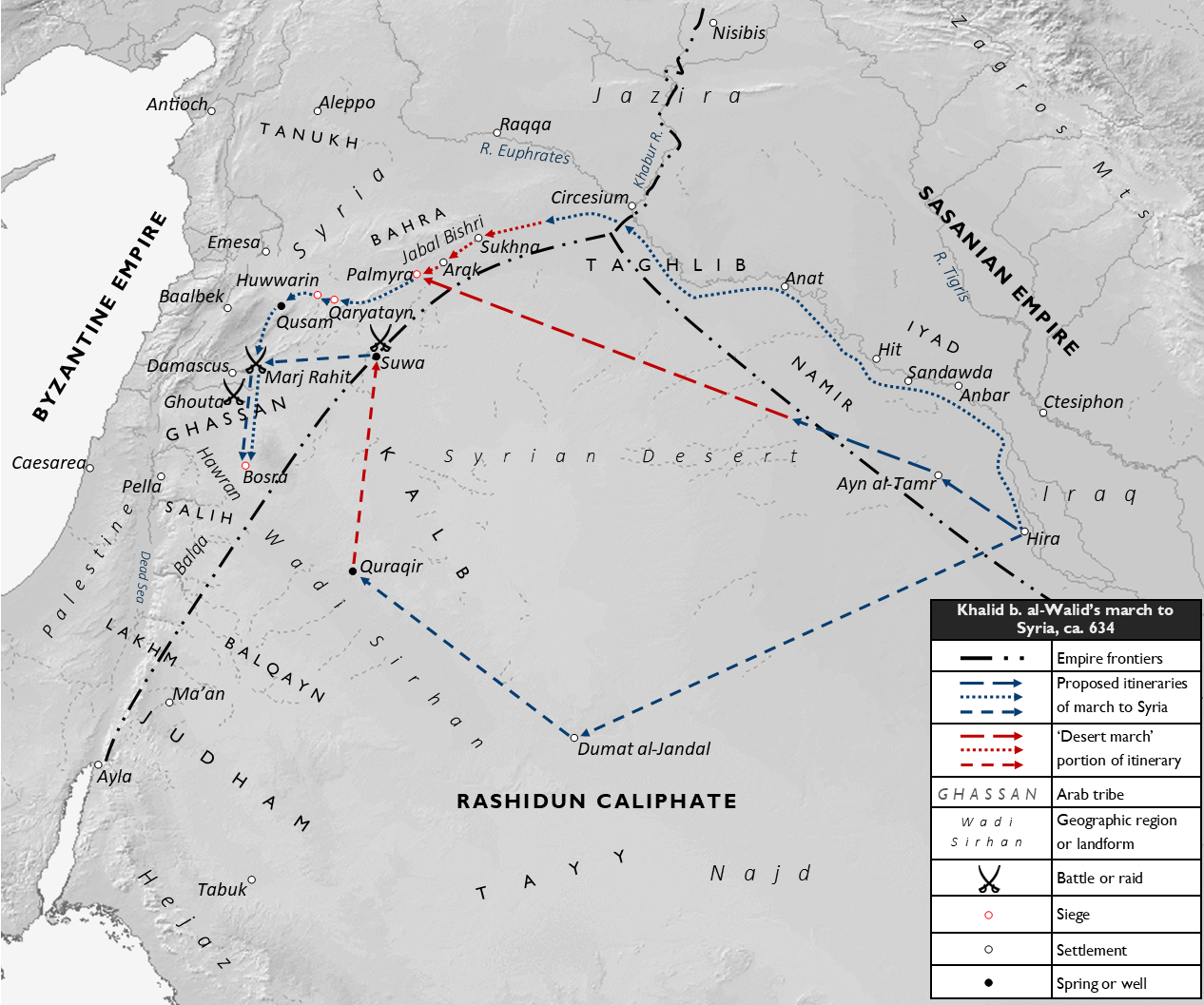
A map showing three general itineraries of Khalid's march to Syria from Iraq around April 634, as summarized by the historian Fred Donner. The 'desert march' portion of the itineraries are indicated in red.

The starting point of Khalid's general march to Syria was al-Hira, according to most of the traditional accounts, with the exception of al-Baladhuri, who places it at Ayn al-Tamr. The segment of the general march called the 'desert march' by the sources occurred at an unclear stage after the al-Hira departure. This phase entailed Khalid and his men—numbering between 500 and 800 strong—marching from a well called Quraqir across a vast stretch of waterless desert for six days and five nights until reaching a source of water at a place called Suwa. As his men did not possess sufficient waterskins to traverse this distance with their horses and camels, Khalid had some twenty of his camels increase their typical water intake and sealed their mouths to prevent the camels from eating and consequently spoiling the water in their stomachs; each day of the march, he had a number of the camels slaughtered so his men could drink the water stored in the camels' stomachs. The utilization of the camels as water storage and the locating of the water source at Suwa were the result of advice given to Khalid by his guide, Rafi ibn Amr of the Tayy.

Excluding the above-mentioned operations in Dumat al-Jandal and the upper Euphrates valley, the traditional accounts agree on only two events of Khalid's route to Syria after the departure from al-Hira: the desert march between Quraqir and Suwa, and a subsequent raid against the Bahra tribe at or near Suwa and operations which resulted in the submission of Palmyra; otherwise, they diverge in tracing Khalid's itinerary. Based on these accounts, Donner summarizes three possible routes taken by Khalid to the vicinity of Damascus: two via Palmyra from the north and the one via Dumat al-Jandal from the south. Kennedy notes the sources are "equally certain" in their advocacy of their respective itineraries and there is "simply no knowing which version is correct".

In the first Palmyra–Damascus itinerary, Khalid marches upwards along the Euphrates—passing through places he had previously reduced—to Jabal al-Bishri and from there successively moves southwestwards through Palmyra, al-Qaryatayn and Huwwarin before reaching the Damascus area. In this route the only span where a desert march could have occurred is between Jabal al-Bishri and Palmyra, though the area between the two places is considerably less than a six-day march and contains a number of water sources. The second Palmyra–Damascus itinerary is a relatively direct route between al-Hira and Palmyra via Ayn al-Tamr. The stretch of desert between Ayn al-Tamr and Palmyra is long enough to corroborate a six-day march and contains scarce watering points, though there are no placenames that can be interpreted as Quraqir or Suwa. In the Dumat al-Jandal–Damascus route, such placenames exist, namely the sites of Qulban Qurajir, associated with 'Quraqir', along the eastern edge of Wadi Sirhan, and Sab Biyar, which is identified with Suwa 150 kilometers (93 mi) east of Damascus. The span between the two sites is arid and corresponds with the six-day march narrative.

The desert march is the most celebrated episode of Khalid's expedition and medieval Futuh ('Islamic conquests') literature in general. Kennedy writes that the desert march "has been enshrined in history and legend. Arab sources marvelled at his [Khalid's] endurance; modern scholars have seen him as a master of strategy." He asserts it is "certain" Khalid embarked on the march, "a memorable feat of military endurance", and "his arrival in Syria was an important ingredient of the success of Muslim arms there". The historian Moshe Gil calls the march "a feat which has no parallel" and a testament to "Khalid's qualities as an outstanding commander". The historian Ryan J. Lynch deems Khalid's desert march to be a literary construct by the authors of the Islamic tradition to form a narrative linking the Muslim conquests of Iraq and Syria and presenting the conquests as "a well-calculated, singular affair" in line with the authors' alleged polemical motives. Lynch holds that the story of the march, which "would have excited and entertained" Muslim audiences, was created out from "fragments of social memory" by inhabitants who attributed the conquests of their towns or areas to Khalid to derive prestige from associating themselves with Khalid.

== Conquest of Syria ==
Most traditional accounts have the first Muslim armies deploy to Syria from Medina at the beginning of 13 AH (early spring 634). The commanders of the Muslim armies were Amr ibn al-As, Yazid ibn Abi Sufyan, Shurahbil ibn Hasana and Abu Ubayda ibn al-Jarrah, though the last may have not deployed to Syria until after Umar's succession to the caliphate in the summer of 634, following Abu Bakr's death. According to Donner, the traditional sources' dating of the first Muslim armies' deployment to Syria was behind by several months. It most likely occurred in the autumn of 633, which better conforms with the anonymous Syriac Chronicle of 724, which dates the first clash between the Muslim armies and the Byzantines to February 634. By the time Khalid had left Iraq, the Muslim armies in Syria had already fought a number of skirmishes with local Byzantine garrisons and dominated the southern Syrian countryside, but did not control any urban centers.

Khalid was appointed supreme commander of the Muslim armies in Syria. Accounts cited by al-Baladhuri, al-Tabari, Ibn A'tham, al-Fasawi (d. 987) and Ibn Hubaysh al-Asadi hold that Abu Bakr appointed Khalid supreme commander as part of his reassignment from Iraq to Syria, citing the general's military talents and record. A single account in al-Baladhuri instead attributes Khalid's appointment to a consensus among the commanders already in Syria, though Athamina asserts "it is inconceivable that a man like [Amr ibn al-As] would agree" to such a decision voluntarily. Upon his accession, Umar may have confirmed Khalid as supreme commander.

After his army's trek across the desert, Khalid reached the meadow of Marj Rahit north of Damascus. He arrived on Easter day of that year, i.e. 24 April 634, a rare precise date cited by most traditional sources, which Donner deems to be likely correct. There, Khalid attacked a group of Ghassanids celebrating Easter before he or his subordinate commanders raided the Ghouta agricultural belt around Damascus. Afterward, Khalid and the commanders of the earlier Muslim armies, except for Amr, assembled at Bosra southeast of Damascus. The trading center of Bosra, along with the Hauran region in which it lies, had historically supplied the nomadic tribes of Arabia with wheat, oil and wine and had been visited by Muhammad during his youth. The Byzantines may not have reestablished an imperial garrison in the city in the aftermath of the Sasanian withdrawal in 628 and the Muslim armies encountered token resistance during their siege. Bosra capitulated in late May 634, making it the first major city in Syria to fall to the Muslims.

Khalid and the Muslim commanders headed west to Palestine to join Amr as the latter's subordinates in the Battle of Ajnadayn, the first major confrontation with the Byzantines, in July. The battle ended in a decisive victory for the Muslims and the Byzantines retreated toward Pella ('Fahl' in Arabic), a major city east of the Jordan River. The Muslims pursued them and scored another major victory at the Battle of Fahl, though it is unclear if Amr or Khalid held overall command in the engagement.

=== Siege of Damascus ===
Muslim and Byzantine troop movements in Syria before the battle of Yarmouk in 636.

The remnants of the Byzantine forces from Ajnadayn and Fahl retreated north to Damascus, where the Byzantine commanders called for imperial reinforcements. Khalid advanced, possibly besting a Byzantine unit at the Marj al-Suffar plain before besieging the city. Each of the five Muslim commanders were charged with blocking one of the city gates; Khalid was stationed at Bab Sharqi (the East Gate). A sixth contingent positioned at Barzeh immediately north of Damascus repulsed relief troops dispatched by the Byzantine emperor Heraclius (r. 575–641).

Several traditions relate the Muslims' capture of Damascus. The most popular narrative is preserved by the Damascus-based Ibn Asakir (d. 1175), according to whom Khalid and his men breached the Bab Sharqi gate. Khalid and his men scaled the city's eastern walls and killed the guards and other defenders at Bab Sharqi. As his forces entered from the east, Muslim forces led by Abu Ubayda had entered peacefully from the western Bab al-Jabiya gate after negotiations with Damascene notables led by Mansur ibn Sarjun, a high-ranking city official. The Muslim armies met up in the city center where capitulation terms were agreed. On the other hand, al-Baladhuri holds that Khalid entered peacefully from Bab Sharqi while Abu Ubayda entered from the west by force. Modern research questions Abu Ubayda's arrival in Syria by the time of the siege. Caetani cast doubt about the aforementioned traditions, while the orientalist Henri Lammens substituted Abu Ubayda with Yazid ibn Abi Sufyan.

In the versions of the Syriac author Dionysius of Tel Mahre (d. 845) and the Melkite patriarch Eutychius of Alexandria (d. 940), the Damascenes led by Mansur, having become weary of the siege and convinced of the besiegers' determination, approached Khalid at Bab Sharqi with an offer to open the gate in return for assurances of safety. Khalid accepted and ordered the drafting of a capitulation agreement. Although several versions of Khalid's treaty were recorded in the early Muslim and Christian sources, (Note: Most of the Muslim accounts are traced to the prominent 8th-century jurist of Syria, al-Awza'i, and among the Muslim historians, the Damascus-based Ibn Asakir devotes the most attention to it, recording six versions of the text. The earliest Christian accounts of the treaty were recorded by the Syriac author Dionysius of Tel Mahre and the Melkite patriarch Eutychius of Alexandria.) they generally concur that the inhabitants' lives, properties and churches were to be safeguarded, in return for their payment of the jizya (poll tax). Imperial properties were confiscated by the Muslims. The treaty probably served as the model for the capitulation agreements made throughout Syria, as well Iraq and Egypt, during the early Muslim conquests. (Note: The Muslim forces entered similar agreements with nearly all the cities they besieged in Syria, including Tiberias, Beisan, Homs, Aleppo, Jerusalem, as well as Alexandria in Egypt and the cities of Upper Mesopotamia.) Although the accounts cited by al-Waqidi (d. 823) and Ibn Ishaq agree that Damascus surrendered in August/September 635, they provide varying timelines of the siege ranging from four to fourteen months.

=== Battle of Yarmouk ===
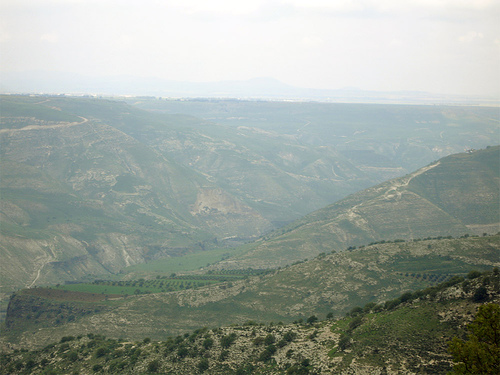
The ravines of the Yarmouk River, in the vicinity of the Battle of Yarmouk

Topographical and strategic map of the Battle of Yarmouk (636 CE), depicting key locations, Roman and Muslim troop positions, roads, rivers, and terrain features. Based on historical sources, including Syvänne (2019), Kaegi (1992), and GIS data. Rashidun Army Current Geographical Boundary Byzantine army Yarmuk River

In the spring of 636, Khalid withdrew his forces from Damascus to the old Ghassanid capital at Jabiya in the Golan. He was prompted by the approach of a large Byzantine army dispatched by Heraclius, consisting of imperial troops led by Vahan and Theodore Trithyrius and frontier troops, including Christian Arab light cavalry led by the Ghassanid phylarch Jabala ibn al-Ayham and Armenian auxiliaries led by a certain Georgius (called Jaraja by the Arabs). The sizes of the forces are disputed by modern historians; Donner holds the Byzantines outnumbered the Muslims four to one, Walter E. Kaegi writes the Byzantines "probably enjoyed numerical superiority" with 15,000–20,000 or more troops, and John Walter Jandora holds there was likely "near parity in numbers" between the two sides with the Muslims at 36,000 men (including 10,000 from Khalid's army) and the Byzantines at about 40,000.

The Byzantine army set up camp at the Ruqqad tributary west of the Muslims' positions at Jabiya. Khalid consequently withdrew, taking up position north of the Yarmouk River, close to where the Ruqqad meets the Yarmouk. The area spanned high hilltops, water sources, critical routes connecting Damascus to the Galilee and historic pastures of the Ghassanids. For over a month, the Muslims held the strategic high ground between Adhri'at (modern Daraa) and their camp near Dayr Ayyub and bested the Byzantines in a skirmish outside Jabiya on 23 July 636. Jandora asserts that the Byzantines' Christian Arab and Armenian auxiliaries deserted or defected, but that the Byzantine force remained "formidable", consisting of a vanguard of heavy cavalry and a rear guard of infantrymen when they approached the Muslim defensive lines.

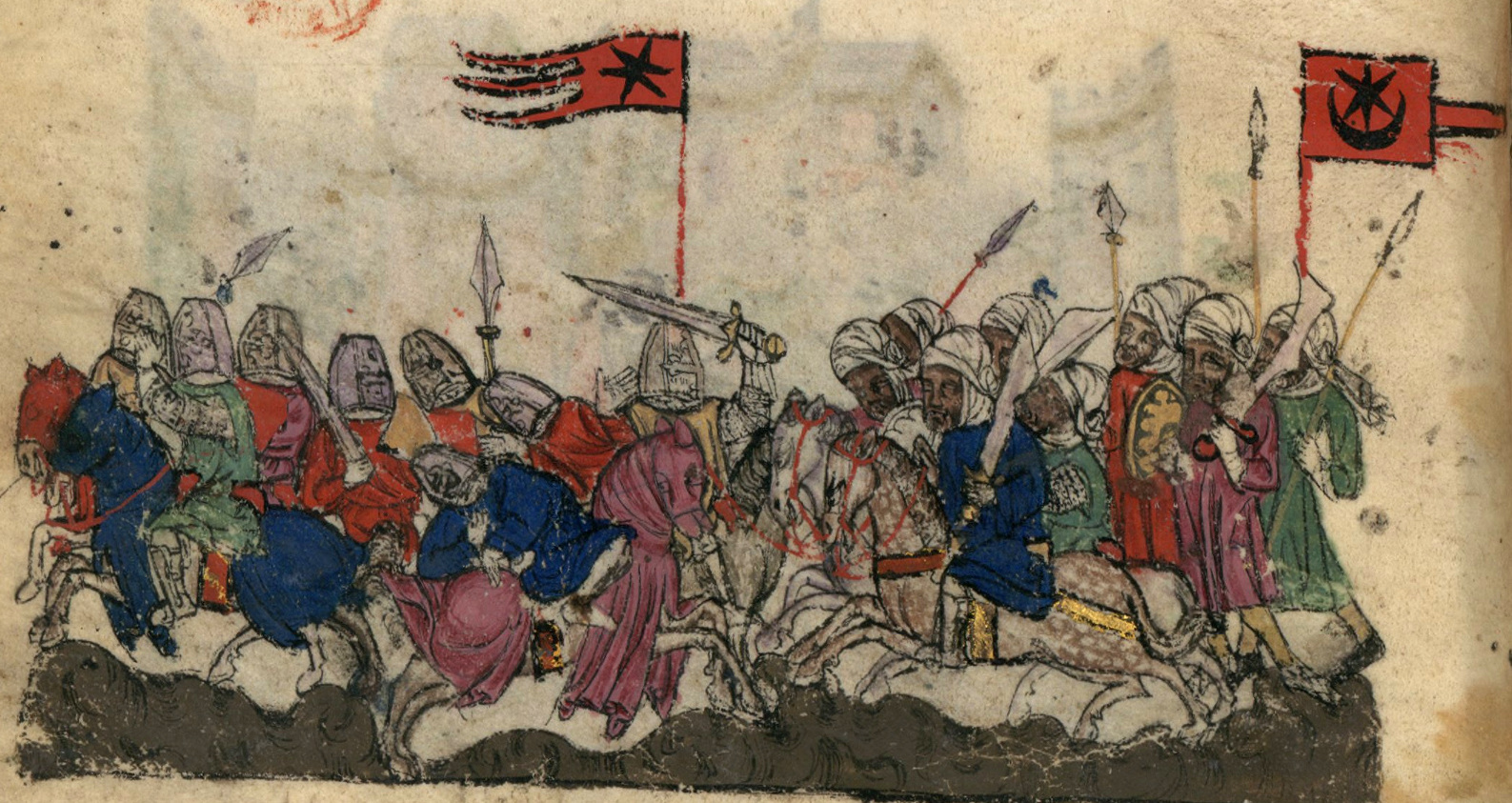
Illustration of the Battle of Yarmouk by an anonymous Catalan illustrator (c. 1310–1325).

Khalid split his cavalry into two main groups, each positioned behind the Muslims' right and left infantry wings to protect his forces from a potential envelopment by the Byzantine heavy cavalry. He stationed an elite squadron of 200–300 horsemen to support the center of his defensive line and left archers posted in the Muslims' camp near Dayr Ayyub, where they could be most effective against an incoming Byzantine force. The Byzantines' initial assaults against the Muslims' right and left flanks successively failed, but they kept up the momentum until the entire Muslim line fell back or, as contemporary Christian sources maintain, feigned retreat.

The Byzantines pursued the Muslims into their camp, where the Muslims had their camel herds hobbled to form a series of defensive perimeters from which the infantry could fight and which Byzantine cavalries could not easily penetrate. As a result, the Byzantines were left vulnerable to attack by Muslim archers, their momentum was halted and their left flank exposed. Khalid and his cavalries used the opportunity to pierce the Byzantines' left flank, taking advantage of the gap between the Byzantine infantry and cavalry. Khalid enveloped the opposing heavy cavalry on either side, but intentionally left an opening from which the Byzantines could only escape northward, far from their infantry. According to the 9th-century Byzantine historian Theophanes, the Byzantine infantry mutinied under Vahan, possibly in light of Theodore's failure to counter the attack on the cavalry. The infantry was subsequently routed.

The Byzantine cavalry, meanwhile, had withdrawn north to the area between the Ruqqad and Allan tributaries. Khalid sent a force to pursue and prevent them from regrouping. He followed up with a nighttime operation in which he seized the Ruqqad bridge, the only viable withdrawal route for the Byzantines. The Muslims then assaulted the Byzantines' camps on 20 August and massacred most of the Byzantine troops, or induced panic in Byzantine ranks, causing thousands to die in the Yarmouk's ravines in an attempt to make a westward retreat.

Jandora credits the Muslim victory at Yarmouk to the cohesion and "superior leadership" of the Muslim army, particularly the "ingenuity" of Khalid, in comparison to the widespread discord in the Byzantine army's ranks and the conventional tactics of Theodorus, which Khalid "correctly anticipated". In Gil's view, Khalid's withdrawal before the army of Heraclius, the evacuation of Damascus and the counter-movement on the Yarmouk tributaries "are evidence of his excellent organising ability and his skill at manoeuvring on the battlefield". The Byzantine rout marked the destruction of their last effective army in Syria, immediately securing earlier Muslim gains in Palestine and Transjordan and paving the way for the recapture of Damascus in December, this time by Abu Ubayda, and the conquest of the Beqaa Valley and ultimately the rest of Syria to the north. In Jandora's assessment, Yarmouk was one of "the most important battles of World History", ultimately leading to Muslim victories which expanded the Caliphate between the Pyrenees mountains and Central Asia.

=== Demotion ===
Khalid was retained as supreme commander of the Muslim forces in Syria between six months and two years from the start of Umar's caliphate, depending on the source. Modern historians mostly agree that Umar's dismissal of Khalid probably occurred in the aftermath of Yarmouk. The caliph appointed Abu Ubayda to Khalid's place, reassigned his troops to the remaining Muslim commanders and subordinated Khalid under the command of one of Abu Ubayda's lieutenants; a later order deployed the bulk of Khalid's former troops to Iraq. Varied causes for Khalid's dismissal from the supreme command are cited by the early Islamic sources. Among them were his independent decision-making and minimal coordination with the leadership in Medina; older allegations of moral misconduct, including his execution of Malik ibn Nuwayra and subsequent marriage to Malik's widow; accusations of generous distribution of booty to members of the tribal nobility to the detriment of eligible early Muslim converts; personal animosity between Khalid and Umar; and Umar's uneasiness over Khalid's heroic reputation among the Muslims, which he feared could develop into a personality cult.

The modern historians De Goeje, William Muir and Andreas Stratos viewed Umar's enmity with Khalid as a contributing cause of Khalid's dismissal. Shaban acknowledges the enmity but asserts it had no bearing on the caliph's decision. De Goeje dismisses Khalid's extravagant grants to the tribal nobility, a common practice among the early Muslim leaders including Muhammad, as a cause for his sacking. Muir, Becker, Stratos and Philip K. Hitti have proposed that Khalid was ultimately dismissed because the Muslim gains in Syria in the aftermath of Yarmouk required the replacement of a military commander at the helm with a capable administrator such as Abu Ubayda.

Athamina doubts all the aforementioned reasons, arguing the cause "must have been vital" at a time when large parts of Syria remained under Byzantine control and Heraclius had not abandoned the province. Athamina holds that "with all his military limitations", Abu Ubayda would not have been considered "a worthy replacement for Khālid's incomparable talents". Medina's lack of a regular standing army, the need to redeploy fighters to other fronts, and the Byzantine threat to Muslim gains in Syria all required the establishment of a defense structure based on the older-established Arab tribes in Syria, which had served as confederates of Byzantium. After Medina's entreaties to the leading confederates, the Ghassanids, were rebuffed, relations were established with the Kalb, Judham and Lakhm. These tribes likely considered the large numbers of outside Arab tribesmen in Khalid's army as a threat to their political and economic power. Khalid's initial force of 500–800 men had swelled to as high as 10,000 as a result of tribesmen joining his army's ranks from the Iraqi front or Arabia and as high as 30,000–40,000 factoring in their families. Athamina concludes Umar dismissed Khalid and recalled his troops from Syria as an overture to the Kalb and their allies.

=== Operations in northern Syria ===
Abu Ubayda and Khalid proceeded from Damascus northward to Homs (called Emesa by the Byzantines) and besieged the city probably in the winter of 636–637. The siege held amid a number of sorties by the Byzantine defenders and the city capitulated in the spring. Per the surrender terms, taxes were imposed on the inhabitants in return for guarantees of protection for their property, churches, water mills and the city walls. A quarter of the church of St. John was reserved for Muslim use, and abandoned houses and gardens were confiscated and distributed by Abu Ubayda or Khalid among the Muslim troops and their families. Owing to its proximity to the desert steppe, Homs was viewed as a favorable place of settlement for Arab tribesmen and became the first city in Syria to acquire a large Muslim population.

Information about the subsequent conquests in northern Syria is scant and partly contradictory. Khalid was dispatched by Abu Ubayda to conquer Qinnasrin (called Chalcis by the Byzantines) and nearby Aleppo. Khalid routed a Byzantine force led by a certain Minas in the outskirts of Qinnasrin. There, Khalid spared the inhabitants following their appeal and claim that they were Arabs forcibly conscripted by the Byzantines. He followed up by besieging the walled town of Qinnasrin, which capitulated in August/September 638. He and Iyad ibn Ghanm then launched the first Muslim raid into Byzantine Anatolia. Khalid made Qinnasrin his headquarters, settling there with his wife. Khalid was appointed Abu Ubayda's deputy governor in Qinnasrin in 638. The campaigns against Homs and Qinnasrin resulted in the conquest of northwestern Syria and prompted Heraclius to abandon his headquarters at Edessa for Samosata in Anatolia and ultimately to the imperial capital of Constantinople.

Khalid may have participated in the siege of Jerusalem, which capitulated in 637 or 638. According to al-Tabari, he was one of the witnesses of a letter of assurance by Umar to Patriarch Sophronius of Jerusalem guaranteeing the safety of the city's people and property.

=== Dismissal and death ===
According to Sayf ibn Umar, later in 638 Khalid was rumored to have lavishly distributed war spoils from his northern Syrian campaigns, including a sum to the Kindite nobleman al-Ash'ath ibn Qays. Umar consequently ordered that Abu Ubayda publicly interrogate and relieve Khalid from his post regardless of the interrogation's outcome, as well as to put Qinnasrin under Abu Ubayda's direct administration. Following his interrogation in Homs, Khalid issued successive farewell speeches to the troops in Qinnasrin and Homs before being summoned by Umar to Medina. Sayf's account notes that Umar sent notice to the Muslim garrisons in Syria and Iraq that Khalid was dismissed not as a result of improprieties but because the troops had become "captivated by illusions on account of him [Khalid]" and he feared they would disproportionately place their trust in him rather than God.

Khalid's sacking did not elicit public backlash, possibly due to existing awareness in the Muslim polity of Umar's enmity toward Khalid, which prepared the public for his dismissal, or because of existing hostility toward the Makhzum in general as a result of their earlier opposition to Muhammad and the early Muslims. In the account of Ibn Asakir, Umar declared at a council of the Muslim army at Jabiya in 638 that Khalid was dismissed for lavishing war spoils on war heroes, tribal nobles and poets instead of reserving the sums for needy Muslims. No attending commanders voiced opposition, except for a Makhzumite who accused Umar of violating the military mandate given to Khalid by Muhammad. According to the Muslim jurist al-Zuhri (d. 742), before his death in 639, Abu Ubayda appointed Khalid and Iyad ibn Ghanm as his successors, but Umar confirmed only Iyad as governor of the Homs–Qinnasrin–Jazira district and appointed Yazid ibn Abi Sufyan governor over the rest of Syria, namely the districts of Damascus, Jordan and Palestine. Following his dismissal, some sources report that Khalid spent his remaining years in Homs with his family, rarely leaving the city and largely withdrawn from public life, while remaining devoted to Islam.

Khalid died in Medina or Homs in 21 AH (c. 642 CE). Purported hadiths related about Khalid include Muhammad's urgings to Muslims not to harm Khalid and prophecies that Khalid would be dealt injustices despite his tremendous contributions to Islam. In Islamic literary narratives, Umar expresses remorse over dismissing Khalid, and the women of Medina mourn his death en masse, with Umar later stating on his deathbed that had Abu Ubayda, Muadh ibn Jabal, or Khalid been alive, he would have chosen one of them as his successor. Athamina considers these all to be "no more than latter-day expressions of sympathy on the part of subsequent generations for the heroic character of Khalid as portrayed by Islamic tradition".

== Legacy ==
Expansion of Rashidun Caliphate

Khalid is credited by the early sources for being the most effective commander of the conquests, including after his dismissal from the supreme command. However, the same sources also present a mixed assessment of him due to his early confrontation with Muhammad at the Battle of Uhud, his reputation for brutal or disproportionate actions against Arab tribes during the Ridda wars, and the unease his military fame caused among pious early Muslims.

According to historian Richard Blackburn, despite these attempts in the early sources to discredit Khalid, his reputation developed as "Islam's most formidable warrior" during the time of Muhammad, Abu Bakr, and the conquest of Syria. He is considered "one of the tactical geniuses of the early Islamic period" by Donner. The historian Carole Hillenbrand calls him "the most famous of all Arab Muslim generals", and Humphreys describes him as "perhaps the most famous and brilliant Arab general of the Riddah wars and the early conquests". Watt credits Khalid "as one of the creators of the Arab empire" due to his "superb generalship, especially in the years immediately following Muhammad's death". Kennedy calls him "the greatest general of the Muslim army" and notes that "his reputation as a great general has lasted through the generations and streets are named after him all over the Arab world". William Muir described Khalid as the "most prominent figure in early Islam after Abu Bakr and Umar", and regarded him as "one of the greatest generals in the world" for leading key victories that he believed were crucial to Islam’s survival and expansion.

In Sunni tradition, Khalid is viewed as a heroic figure, particularly remembered as a war hero. In Shia tradition, he is viewed more critically, particularly as a war criminal for his execution of Malik ibn Nuwayra and his immediate marriage to Nuwayra's widow, which they view as a violation of the traditional Islamic bereavement period.

=== Family and claimants of descent ===
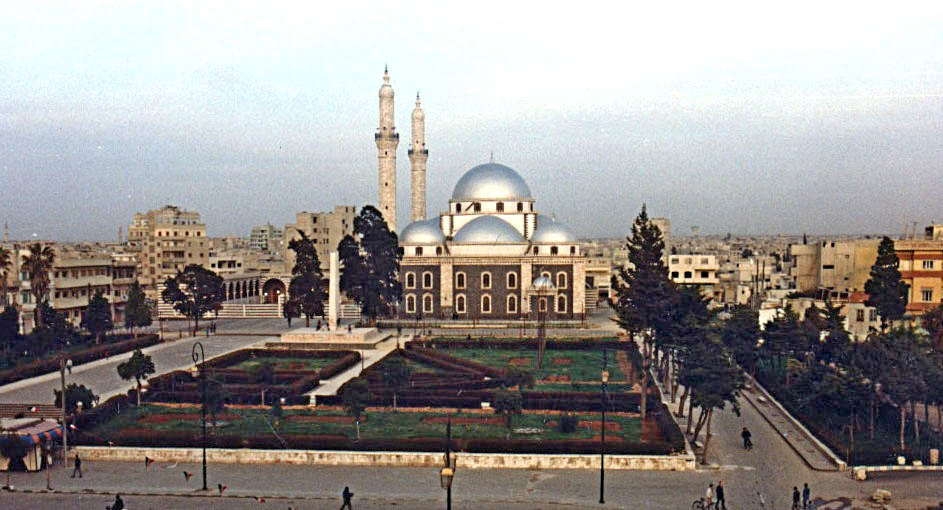
Since at least the 12th century, Khalid's tomb has been purported to be located in the present-day Khalid ibn al-Walid Mosque in Homs, Syria

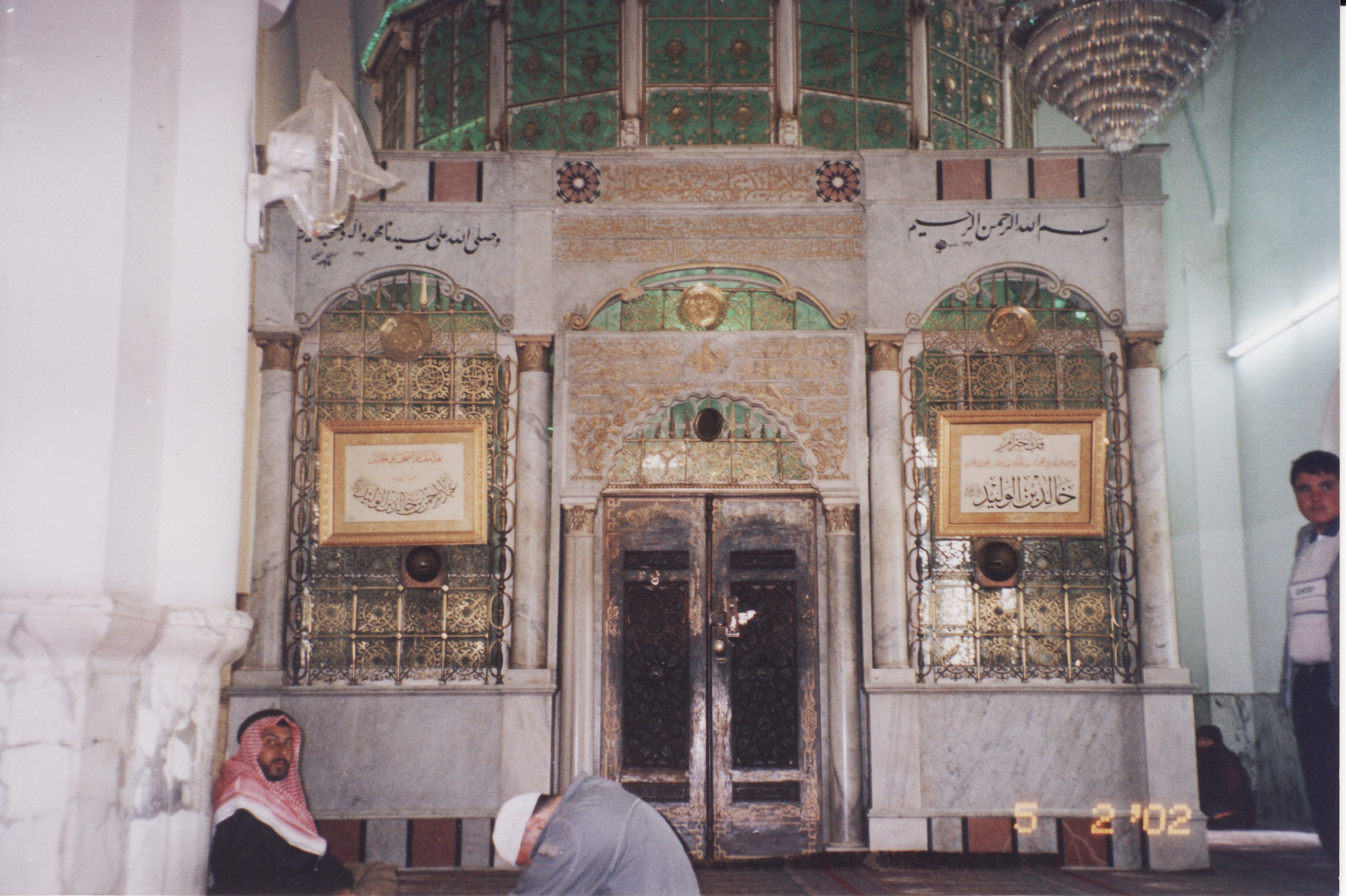
The purported tomb of Khalid within the Khalid ibn al-Walid Mosque

Khalid's eldest son was named Sulayman, hence his kunya ('paedonymic') Abu Sulayman ('father of Sulayman'). Khalid was married to Asma, a daughter of Anas ibn Mudrik, a prominent chieftain and poet of the Khath'am tribe. Their son Abd al-Rahman became a reputable commander in the Arab–Byzantine wars and a close aide of Mu'awiya ibn Abi Sufyan, the governor of Syria and later founder and first caliph of the Umayyad Caliphate, serving as the latter's deputy governor of the Homs–Qinnasrin–Jazira district. Another son of Khalid, Muhajir, supported Ali during his caliphate (r. 656–661), and was killed fighting against the Syrian army of Mu'awiya at the Battle of Siffin in 657 during the First Fitna. Following Abd al-Rahman's death in 666, allegedly as a result of poisoning ordered by Mu'awiya, Muhajir's son Khalid attempted to take revenge for his uncle's slaying and was arrested, but Mu'awiya later released him after Khalid paid the blood money. Abd al-Rahman's son Khalid was a commander of a naval campaign against the Byzantines in 668 or 669.

There is no further significant role played by members of Khalid's family in the historical record. His male line of descent ended toward the collapse of the Umayyad Caliphate in 750 or shortly after when all forty of his male descendants died in a plague in Syria, according to the 11th-century historian Ibn Hazm. As a result, his family's properties, including his residence and several other houses in Medina, were inherited by Ayyub ibn Salama, a great-grandson of Khalid's brother al-Walid ibn al-Walid. They remained in the possession of Ayyub's descendants until at least the late 9th century. (Note: Following his conversion to Islam, Khalid was granted a plot of land by the Islamic prophet Muhammad immediately east of the Prophet's Mosque in Medina to build his house, which was completed before Muhammad's death. It was a small plot, a result of his relatively late conversion (most available plots had already been granted to earlier converts), but after complaining of the size, Khalid was permitted by Muhammad to build higher than the other houses in Medina. Khalid declared his house a charitable endowment, prohibiting his descendants from selling or passing ownership of it. In the 12th century, Kamal al-Din Muhammad al-Shahrazuri, the head qadi (Islamic judge) of the Zengid dynasty in Syria, purchased and converted Khalid's house in Medina into a ribat ('charitable house' or 'hospice') for men.)

The family of the 12th-century Arab poet Ibn al-Qaysarani claimed descent from Muhajir ibn Khalid, though the 13th-century historian Ibn Khallikan notes the claim contradicted the consensus of Arabic historians and genealogists that Khalid's line of descent terminated in the early Islamic period. A female line of descent may have survived and was claimed by the 15th-century Sufi religious leader Siraj al-Din Muhammad ibn Ali al-Makhzumi of Homs. Kızıl Ahmed Bey, the leader of the Isfendiyarids, who ruled a principality in Anatolia until its annexation by the Ottomans, fabricated his dynasty's descent from Khalid. The Sur tribe under Sher Shah, a 16th-century ruler of India, also claimed descent from Khalid.

=== Mausoleum in Homs ===
Starting in the Ayyubid period in Syria (1182–1260), Homs has obtained fame as the location of the purported tomb and mosque of Khalid. The 12th-century traveler Ibn Jubayr noted that the tomb contained the graves of Khalid and his son Abd al-Rahman. Muslim tradition since then has placed Khalid's tomb in the city. The building was altered by the first Ayyubid sultan Saladin (r. 1171–1193) and again in the 13th century. The Mamluk sultan Baybars (r. 1260–1277) attempted to link his own military achievements with those of Khalid by having an inscription honoring himself carved on Khalid's mausoleum in Homs in 1266. During his 17th-century visit to the mausoleum, the Muslim scholar Abd al-Ghani al-Nabulsi agreed that Khalid was buried there but also noted an alternative Islamic tradition that the grave belonged to Mu'awiya's grandson Khalid ibn Yazid. The current mosque dates to 1908 when the Ottoman authorities rebuilt the structure.

== See also ==
- 7th century in Lebanon § Ṣaḥāba who have visited Lebanon
- List of battles of Muhammad

== Bibliography ==
- Al-Aqqad, Abbas Mahmoud (2011). عبقرية خالد [Genius of Khalid] (in Arabic). Dār Nahḍ̣at Miṣr lil-Nashr. ISBN 978-9771425588.
- Ansary, Tamim (2009). Destiny Disrupted: A History of the World Through Islamic Eyes. PublicAffairs. ISBN 978-1586486068.
- Athamina, Khalil (1994). "The Appointment and Dismissal of Khālid b. al-Walīd from the Supreme Command: A Study of the Political Strategy of the Early Muslim Caliphs in Syria". Arabica. 41 (2): 253–272. doi:10.1163/157005894X00191. JSTOR 4057449.
- Blackburn, Richard (2005). Journey to the Sublime Porte: The Arabic Memoir of a Sharifian Agent's Diplomatic Mission to the Ottoman Imperial Court in the Era of Suleyman the Magnificent; the Relevant Text from Quṭb al-Dīn al-Nahrawālī's al-Fawā'id al-sanīyah fī al-riḥlah al-Madanīyah wa al-Rūmīyah. Beirut: Orient-Institut. ISBN 3-89913-441-9.
- Blankinship, Khalid Yahya, ed. (1993). The History of al-Ṭabarī, Volume XI: The Challenge to the Empires. SUNY Series in Near Eastern Studies. Albany, New York: State University of New York Press. ISBN 978-0-7914-0851-3.
- Bosworth, C. E. (1960). "Buzākha". In Gibb, H. A. R.; Kramers, J. H.; Lévi-Provençal, E.; Schacht, J.; Lewis, B. & Pellat, Ch. (eds.). The Encyclopaedia of Islam, Second Edition. Volume I: A–B. Leiden: E. J. Brill. p. 1358. OCLC 495469456.
- Crone, P. (1978). "Khālid b. al-Walīd". In van Donzel, E.; Lewis, B.; Pellat, Ch. & Bosworth, C. E. (eds.). The Encyclopaedia of Islam, Second Edition. Volume IV: Iran–Kha. Leiden: E. J. Brill. pp. 928–929. ISBN 978-90-04-05745-6. OCLC 758278456.
- De Slane, Mac Guckin (1842). Ibn Khallikan's Biographical Dictionary, Volume 1. Paris: Oriental Translation Fund of Great Britain and Ireland. OCLC 833614603.
- Della Vida, G. Levi (1978). "Khathʿam". In van Donzel, E.; Lewis, B.; Pellat, Ch. & Bosworth, C. E. (eds.). The Encyclopaedia of Islam, Second Edition. Volume IV: Iran–Kha. Leiden: E. J. Brill. pp. 1105–1106. ISBN 978-90-04-05745-6. OCLC 758278456.
- Donner, Fred M. (1981). The Early Islamic Conquests. Princeton: Princeton University Press. ISBN 0-691-05327-8.
- Elad, Amikam (2016). The Rebellion of Muḥammad al-Nafs al-Zakiyya in 145/762: Ṭālibīs and Early ʿAbbāsīs in Conflict. Leiden: Brill. ISBN 978-90-04-22989-1.
- Elisséeff, Nikita (1965). "Dimashk". In Lewis, B.; Pellat, Ch. & Schacht, J. (eds.). The Encyclopaedia of Islam, Second Edition. Volume II: C–G. Leiden: E. J. Brill. pp. 277–291. OCLC 495469475.
- Elisséeff, Nikita (1986). "Kinnasrīn". In Bosworth, C. E.; van Donzel, E.; Lewis, B. & Pellat, Ch. (eds.). The Encyclopaedia of Islam, Second Edition. Volume V: Khe–Mahi. Leiden: E. J. Brill. pp. 124–125. ISBN 978-90-04-07819-2.
- Friedmann, Yohanan, ed. (1992). The History of al-Ṭabarī, Volume XII: The Battle of al-Qādisīyyah and the Conquest of Syria and Palestine. SUNY Series in Near Eastern Studies. Albany, New York: State University of New York Press. ISBN 978-0-7914-0733-2.
- Gil, Moshe (1997) [1992]. A History of Palestine, 634–1099. Translated by Ethel Broido (Revised ed.). Cambridge and New York: Cambridge University Press. ISBN 0-521-40437-1.
- Hill, D. R. (1975). "The Role of the Camel and the Horse in the Early Arab Conquests". In Parry, V. J.; Yapp, M. E. (eds.). War, Technology and Society in the Middle East. London: Oxford University Press, School of Oriental and African Studies. pp. 32–43. ISBN 0-19-713581-1.
- Hillenbrand, Carole (1999). The Crusades: Islamic Perspectives. Chicago: Fitzroy Dearborn Publishers. ISBN 1-57958-210-9.
- Hinds, M. (1991). "Makhzūm". In Bosworth, C. E.; van Donzel, E. & Pellat, Ch. (eds.). The Encyclopaedia of Islam, Second Edition. Volume VI: Mahk–Mid. Leiden: E. J. Brill. pp. 137–140. ISBN 978-90-04-08112-3.
- Humphreys, R. Stephen, ed. (1990). The History of al-Ṭabarī, Volume XV: The Crisis of the Early Caliphate: The Reign of ʿUthmān, A.D. 644–656/A.H. 24–35. SUNY Series in Near Eastern Studies. Albany, New York: State University of New York Press. ISBN 978-0-7914-0154-5.
- Jandora, John W. (1985). "The Battle of the Yarmūk: A Reconstruction". Journal of Asian History. 19 (1): 8–21. JSTOR 41930557.
- Jankowiak, Marek (2013). "The First Arab Siege of Constantinople". In Zuckerman, Constantin (ed.). Travaux et mémoires, Vol. 17: Constructing the Seventh Century. Paris: Association des Amis du Centre d'Histoire et Civilisation de Byzance. pp. 237–320. ISBN 978-2-916716-45-9.
- Juynboll, Gautier H.A., ed. (1989). The History of al-Ṭabarī, Volume XIII: The Conquest of Iraq, Southwestern Persia, and Egypt: The Middle Years of ʿUmar's Caliphate, A.D. 636–642/A.H. 15–21. SUNY Series in Near Eastern Studies. Albany, New York: State University of New York Press. ISBN 978-0-88706-876-8.
- Kaegi, Walter E. (1995). Byzantium and the Early Islamic Conquests. Cambridge: Cambridge University Press. ISBN 0-521-41172-6.
- Kaegi, Walter E. (2002). "Yarmūk". In Bearman, P. J.; Bianquis, Th.; Bosworth, C. E.; van Donzel, E. & Heinrichs, W. P. (eds.). The Encyclopaedia of Islam, Second Edition. Volume XI: W–Z. Leiden: E. J. Brill. pp. 289–292. ISBN 978-90-04-12756-2.
- Kennedy, Hugh (2004) [1986]. The Prophet and the Age of the Caliphates: The Islamic Near East from the 6th to the 11th Century (Second ed.). Harlow: Longman. ISBN 978-0-582-40525-7.
- Kennedy, Hugh (2007). The Great Arab Conquests: How the Spread of Islam Changed the World We Live In. Philadelphia: Da Capo Press. ISBN 978-0-306-81585-0.
- Kister, M. J. (2002). "The Struggle against Musaylima and the Conquest of Yamama". Jerusalem Studies in Arabic and Islam. 27: 1–56.
- Lammens, Henri (1993) [1927]. "Makhzūm". In Houtsma, M. Th.; Wensinck, A. J.; Levi-Provençal, E.; Gibb, H. A. R.; Heffening, W. (eds.). E.J. Brill's First Encyclopaedia of Islam, 1913–1936, Volume 5 L–Moriscos (Reprint ed.). Leiden, New York and Koln: E. J. Brill. pp. 171–172. ISBN 90-04-09791-0.
- Landau-Tasseron, Ella (1991). "Mālik b. Nuwayra". In Bosworth, C. E.; van Donzel, E. & Pellat, Ch. (eds.). The Encyclopaedia of Islam, Second Edition. Volume VI: Mahk–Mid. Leiden: E. J. Brill. pp. 267–269. ISBN 978-90-04-08112-3.
- Landau-Tasseron, Ella, ed. (1998). The History of al-Ṭabarī, Volume XXXIX: Biographies of the Prophet's Companions and their Successors: al-Ṭabarī's Supplement to his History. SUNY Series in Near Eastern Studies. Albany, New York: State University of New York Press. ISBN 978-0-7914-2819-1.
- Lecker, Michael (1989). "The Estates of 'Amr b. al-'Āṣ in Palestine: Notes on a New Negev Arabic Inscription". Bulletin of the School of Oriental and African Studies, University of London. 52 (1): 24–37. doi:10.1017/S0041977X00023041. JSTOR 617911. S2CID 163092638.
- Lecker, Michael (2004). "Al-Ridda". In Bearman, P. J.; Bianquis, Th.; Bosworth, C. E.; van Donzel, E. & Heinrichs, W. P. (eds.). The Encyclopaedia of Islam, Second Edition. Volume XII: Supplement. Leiden: E. J. Brill. pp. 692–695. ISBN 978-90-04-13974-9.
- Lecker, Michael (2019). "The Houses of Khālid ibn al-Walīd and ʿAmr ibn al-ʿĀs Near the Prophet's Mosque". In Peleg-Barkat, Orit; Ashkenazi, Jacob; Leibner, Uzi; Aviam, Mordechai; Talgam, Rina (eds.). Between Sea and Desert: On Kings, Nomads, Cities and Monks: Essays in Honor of Joseph Patrich. Jerusalem: Ostracon. pp. 67–73. ISBN 978-965-92534-2-5.
- Lynch, Ryan J. (2013). "Linking Information, Creating a Legend: The Desert March of Khālid b. al-Walīd". Lights: The MESSA Journal of the University of Chicago. 2 (2): 28–41.
- Madelung, Wilferd (1997). The Succession to Muhammad: A Study of the Early Caliphate. Cambridge: Cambridge University Press. ISBN 0-521-56181-7.
- Muir, William (2008). Weir, Thomas Hunter (ed.). “The” Caliphate, Its Rise, Decline, and Fall: From Original Sources. Edinburgh and Michigan: J. Grant, 1924.
- Mulder, Stephennie (2014). "Seeing the Light: Enacting the Divine at Three Medieval Syrian Shrines". In Roxburgh, David J. (ed.). Envisioning Islamic Art and Architecture: Essays in Honor of Renata Holod. Leiden and Boston: Brill. pp. 88–108. ISBN 978-90-04-26402-1.
- Pourshariati, Parvaneh (2008). Decline and Fall of the Sasanian Empire: The Sasanian-Parthian Confederacy and the Arab Conquest of Iran. London and New York: I. B. Tauris. ISBN 978-1-84511-645-3.
- Powers, David S. (2009). Muhammad Is Not the Father of Any of Your Men: The Making of the Last Prophet. Philadelphia: University of Pennsylvania Press. ISBN 978-0-8122-4178-5.
- Robinson, C. F. (2000). "Uḥud". In Bearman, P. J.; Bianquis, Th.; Bosworth, C. E.; van Donzel, E. & Heinrichs, W. P. (eds.). The Encyclopaedia of Islam, Second Edition. Volume X: T–U. Leiden: E. J. Brill. pp. 782–783. ISBN 978-90-04-11211-7.
- Schleifer, J. (1971). "Banuʾl-Ḥārith b. Kaʿb". In Lewis, B.; Ménage, V. L.; Pellat, Ch. & Schacht, J. (eds.). The Encyclopaedia of Islam, Second Edition. Volume III: H–Iram. Leiden: E. J. Brill. p. 223. OCLC 495469525.
- Shaban, M. A. (1971). Islamic History: A New Interpretation, Volume 1, A.D. 600–750 (A.H. 132). Cambridge: Cambridge University Press. ISBN 978-0-521-08137-5.
- Shoufani, Elias S. (1973). Al-Riddah and the Muslim Conquest of Arabia. Toronto: University of Toronto Press. ISBN 0-8020-1915-3.
- Sirriya, Elizabeth (1979). "Ziyārāt of Syria in a "Riḥla" of 'Abd al-Ghanī al-Nābulusī (1050/1641–1143/1731)". The Journal of the Royal Asiatic Society of Great Britain and Ireland. 111 (2): 109–122. doi:10.1017/s0035869x00135543. S2CID 163434595.
- Umari, Akram Diya (1991). Madīnan Society at the Time of the Prophet, Volume II: The Jihād against the Mushrikūn. Translated by Huda Khattab. Herndon, Virginia: The International Institute of Islamic Thought. ISBN 0-912463-37-6.
- Vaglieri, L. V. (1965). "Dūmat al-Djandal". In Lewis, B.; Pellat, Ch. & Schacht, J. (eds.). The Encyclopaedia of Islam, Second Edition. Volume II: C–G. Leiden: E. J. Brill. p. 624–626. OCLC 495469475.
- Watt, W. Montgomery (1956). Muhammad at Medina. Oxford: Clarendon Press. OCLC 3456619.
- Watt, W. Montgomery (1960). "Abū Bakr". In Gibb, H. A. R.; Kramers, J. H.; Lévi-Provençal, E.; Schacht, J.; Lewis, B. & Pellat, Ch. (eds.). The Encyclopaedia of Islam, Second Edition. Volume I: A–B. Leiden: E. J. Brill. pp. 109–111. OCLC 495469456.
- Watt, W. Montgomery (1961). Muhammad: Prophet and Statesman. Oxford University Press.
- Watt, W. Montgomery (1971). "Al-Ḥudaybiya". In Lewis, B.; Ménage, V. L.; Pellat, Ch. & Schacht, J. (eds.). The Encyclopaedia of Islam, Second Edition. Volume III: H–Iram. Leiden: E. J. Brill. p. 539. OCLC 495469525.
- Zein, Ibrahim; El-Wakil, Ahmed (2020). "Khālid b. al-Wālid's Treaty with the People of Damascus: Identifying the Source Document through Shared and Competing Historical Memories". Journal of Islamic Studies. 31 (3): 295–328. doi:10.1093/jis/etaa029.
- Zetterstéen, K. V. (1965). "K̲h̲ālid b. al-Walīd b. al-Mughīra al-Makhzūmī". In Gibb, H. A. R.; Kramers, J. H. (eds.). Shorter Encyclopaedia of Islam. Cornell: Cornell University Press. pp. 235–236. OCLC 609717677.
- Marozzi, Justin (2022). The Arab Conquests. Bloomsbury USA. ISBN 978-1-8389-3340-1.
