= Expedition of Khalid ibn al-Walid (Banu Jadhimah) =

Muslim military expedition against Banu Jadhimah in January 630 AD

| Date | January 630 AD, 8 AH |
| Location | Mecca |
| Result | Banu Jadhima being subdued and brought under Islamic influence. |

Commanders and leaders
| Khalid ibn al-Walid | Unknown |

Strength
| 350 | Unknown |

Casualties and losses
| 0 | Portion of the tribe executed |

The Expedition of Khalid ibn al-Walid against the Banu Jadhimah took place in January 630 AD (8 AH, 9th month of the Islamic Calendar). Muhammad dispatched Khalid ibn Walid to invite the tribesmen to Islam.

== Overview ==
Banu Jadhimah were notorious during the Jahiliyyah (pre-Islamic era) for their extreme violence and were infamously known as "the lickers of blood." Among those they reportedly killed were al-Fakih ibn al-Mughira and his brother, both uncles of Khalid ibn al-Walid, as well as the father of Abd al-Rahman ibn Awf. They were also responsible for the deaths of Malik ibn al-Sharid and his three brothers from Banu Sulaym in a single incident, along with others from various tribes.

In the year 8 of the Hijrah, Khalid was dispatched by Muhammad to invite the Banu Jadhimah to Islam. Khalid persuaded the tribesmen to disarm and embrace Islam. The tribesmen responded to Khalid's call with the phrase “saba’na, saba’na,” meaning "We have become Sabeans," a term understood as a general declaration of conversion. However, due to his unfamiliarity with their accent, Khalid misunderstood this as a rejection of Islam and ordered their execution. When Muhammad learned of this incident, he declared to God that he was innocent of Khalid's actions. He sent Ali ibn Abi Talib to pay compensation to the survivors. Despite this, Muhammad did not discharge Khalid or punish him, and he continued to entrust him with command over other expeditions.

== Islamic sources ==
=== Primary sources ===
The expedition is mentioned in the Sunni hadith collection Sahih al-Bukhari as follows:

The Prophet sent Khalid bin Al-Walid to the tribe of Jadhima and Khalid invited them to Islam but they could not express themselves by saying, "Aslamna (i.e. we have embraced Islam)," but they started saying "Saba'na! Saba'na (i.e. we have come out of one religion to another)." Khalid kept on killing (some of) them and taking (some of) them as captives and gave every one of us his Captive. When there came the day then Khalid ordered that each man (i.e. Muslim soldier) should kill his captive, I said, "By Allah, I will not kill my captive, and none of my companions will kill his captive." When we reached the Prophet, we mentioned to him the whole story. On that, the Prophet raised both his hands and said twice, "O Allah! I am free from what Khalid has done."Sahih al-Bukhari, 5:59:628

Muhammad Muhsin Khan stated in his book "The Translation of the Meanings Of Sahih Al-Bukhari" that Muhammad sent Khalid to fight the Banu Jadhima, using this hadith as a reference.

The event is also mentioned by the later Muslim Scholar Ibn Sa'd in his book "Kitab al-tabaqat al-kabir", as follows:

SARIYYAH OF KHALID IBN AL-WALlD AGAINST BANU JADHlMAH, A BRANCH OF BANU KINANAH, RESIDING IN LOWER MAKKAH.

Then (occurred) the sariyyah of Khalid Ibn al-Walid against Banu Jadhimah. A branch of Banu Kinanah, residing in Lower Makkah, at the distance of a day's (journey) towards Yalamlam in Shawwal of the eighth year from the hijrah of the Apostle of Allah, may Allah bless him. It was the day of Procyon. They (narrators) said; When Khalid Ibn al-Walid came back after the demolition of al-'Uzza and the Apostle of Allah, may Allah bless him, was still staying at Makkah, he sent him to Bana Jadhimah to invite them to embrace Islam; he....

[pg 183]his father: he said: I was with the horsemen who attacked Banu Jadhimah under the command of Khalid ibn al-Walid on the day of Procyon. We encountered one of their men with whom there were women. He began to fight us for them...

[pg 184]...related to me on the authority of his father; he said: The Apostle of Allah, may Allah bless him, sent us on the day of Nakhlah (when al-Uzza was demolished), and said: Slay the people as long as you do not hear a Mu'adhdhin or see a mosque

[Kitab al-tabaqat al-kabir, By Ibn Sa'd, Pg 182-183]

=== Modern scholars ===
The Muslim scholar Muhammad Husayn Haykal (d. 1956), in his book "The Life of Muhammad", writes:

His task accomplished, ibn al Walid proceeded to Jadhimah. There, however, the people took up arms at his approach. Khalid asked them to lay down their arms on the grounds that all people had accepted Islam.

One of the Jadhimah tribesman said to his people: "Woe to you, Banu Jadhimah! Don't you know that this is Khalid? By God, nothing awaits you once you have laid down your arms except captivity, and once you have become captives you can expect nothing but death." Some of his people answered: "Do you seek to have us all murdered? Don't you know that most men have converted to Islam, that the war is over, and that security is reestablished?" Those who held this opinion continued to talk to their tribesmen until the latter surrendered their arms.

Thereupon, ibn al Walid ordered them to be bound, and he killed some of them.[Haykal, The Life of Muhammad, Pg 443]

The late James A. Bellamy, Professor Emeritus of Arabic Literature at the University of Michigan, wrote:

In the year 8 of the Hijrah Muhammad sent Khalid b. al-Walid against the Arabs of the lower Tihamah to summon them to Islam but not to fight them. Khalid exceeded his instructions. He persuaded the Banu Jadhimah to disarm and surrender, and then, after binding them, killed a number of the men in cold blood.

=== Interpretation from Scholars ===
According to Ibn Battal, Al-Muhallab ibn Abi Sufra recounted an incident where Khalid ibn al-Walid misinterpreted the words of Banu Jadhimah. He said,

Khalid did not understand that when they said 'Saba’na,' they meant 'We have embraced Islam.' Instead, he took the word at its literal meaning and interpreted it as disbelief. So, he fought them based on this understanding. Later, it became clear that they were actually trying to declare their Islam, but they were ignorant and mistakenly said 'Saba’na.' The reason they said this is that Quraysh used to call anyone who accepted Islam 'Sabee’ (one who has defected).' This word became commonly used among the disbelievers, so these people repeated it. Khalid understood it in its usual meaning, so the Prophet Muhammad (ﷺ) excused him for his interpretation and did not hold him accountable for it.

Ibn Battal further added,

Scholars unanimously agree that if a judge rules unjustly or contrary to the consensus of scholars, his judgment is invalid. However, if the mistake is due to ijtihad (independent reasoning) and interpretation, as was the case with Khalid, then he is not sinful. Yet, according to the majority of scholars, compensation (diya) is still required for the victims. The hadith supports this, as the Prophet Muhammad (ﷺ) said: ‘O Allah, I declare my innocence before You from what Khalid has done.’ His disavowal shows that Khalid’s killing of those who said ‘Saba’na’ was an incorrect ruling. Allah knows all languages and accepts faith from anyone who expresses it in their tongue. However, the Prophet Muhammad (ﷺ) excused Khalid because he had a valid interpretation, and a person who errs in ijtihad is not punished or held sinful.

Al-Khattabi, too, provided insight into the matter, highlighting that Muhammad did not disavow Khalid's actions entirely but rather his haste and lack of verification. He explained,

The only thing the Prophet Muhammad (ﷺ) objected to in Khalid's action was his haste and lack of verification. He should have waited to clarify the meaning behind their words: ‘Saba’na.’ This word generally means ‘leaving a religion’, as in ‘He became a Sabian (Sabaa),’ meaning he abandoned one faith for another. That is why the polytheists called the Prophet Muhammad (ﷺ) a Sabian—because he opposed the religion of his people. So when Banu Jadhimah said ‘Saba’na,’ their words could have meant different things. They might have been saying they left their previous religion, but not necessarily for Islam—perhaps for Judaism or another belief. Since their statement was not a clear declaration of Islam, Khalid acted based on the original command to fight. They did not express their acceptance of Islam with an explicit statement that would ensure their safety. It is also possible that Khalid refrained from accepting their statement because he suspected that they deliberately avoided saying ‘Aslamna’ (We have embraced Islam) out of pride, refusing to submit outright. So, he did not take their words as a genuine conversion. This interpretation is supported by another incident: When Thumama ibn Uthal embraced Islam and entered Mecca for pilgrimage, the Quraysh mocked him, saying, ‘You have Saba’na (defected).’ But he replied, ‘No, I have submitted to Islam.’

Al-Tahawi and Ibn Taymiyyah both agreed that Khalid's mistake was a result of misjudgment rather than sin.

As Al-Tahawi stated,

The Prophet Muhammad (ﷺ) criticized Khalid ibn al-Walid because he should have verified their statement (‘Saba’na’)—whether they meant they had entered Islam or another religion. Since Khalid did not do so, the Prophet Muhammad (ﷺ) disassociated himself from his action. However, he did not punish him because there was no certain knowledge that would justify punishing Khalid for their deaths.

Ibn Taymiyyah, while acknowledging the error, also emphasized that Khalid's leadership was not undermined by this mistake:

Despite this incident, the Prophet Muhammad (ﷺ) did not dismiss Khalid from leadership. Instead, he continued to appoint him and place him in command. This is because when a leader makes a mistake or commits a sin, he is corrected but not necessarily removed from authority. Khalid was not rebellious against the Prophet Muhammad (ﷺ)—he was obedient. However, he did not have the same level of religious knowledge as others, so he misunderstood this particular case.

== See also ==
- Military career of Muhammad
- List of expeditions of Muhammad
