= Siege of Germanicia =

638 CE siege of Byzantine city by the Rashidun Caliphate

Siege of Marash
- Part of the Muslim conquest of Syria (Arab–Byzantine wars)
Date	638 AD
Location	Germanicia (modern Kahramanmaraş) 37°35′N 36°56′E
Result	Rashidun victory
Territorial changes	Germanicia captured by the Rashidun Caliphate

Belligerents
Rashidun Caliphate	Byzantine Empire

Commanders and leaders
Khalid ibn al-Walid	Unknown

The siege of Germanicia or Marash was led by Muslim forces of the Rashidun Caliphate during their campaigns in Anatolia in 638. The city surrendered without much bloodshed. The expedition is considered significant due to the fact that it marked the end of the military career of the Arab Muslim general Khalid ibn Walid, who was dismissed from the army a few months after his return from the expedition.

== Background ==
The Muslims won a decisive victory at the Battle of Yarmouk fought in August 636, thus the attempt made by the Byzantine emperor Heraclius to roll back Roman Syria failed. Further, unable to send more imperial troops to Syria, Heraclius made yet another attempt to re-conquer Syria by the aid of his Christian Arab allies of Jazira. The army of the Christian Arabs laid siege to Emesa in mid-summer of 638. The Muslims avoided a battle in the open and instead opted for a defensive strategy which led to the Battle at Emesa. All the regiments from outposts in northern Syria were called to Emesa. The Christian Arab Army was forced to withdraw their siege when, by the orders of Caliph Umar, the Muslim army from Iraq attacked Jazira. At this point, the rear elements of the besieging army were attacked by a Mobile guard led by Khalid ibn Walid, which in effect left the Byzantine forces devastated. Caliph Umar then launched a full-scale invasion of Jazira which was completed without much resistance in just a few months. As soon as the western part of Jazira was occupied, Abu Ubaidah ibn al-Jarrah wrote to Umar and asked for Ayadh bin Ghanam, who was operating in western Jazira, to be put under his command so that he could use him in raids across the northern border. Umar agreed to this request, and Ayadh moved to Emesa with a part of the Muslim forces sent from Iraq to Jazira.

== Siege ==
In the Autumn of 638, Abu Ubaidah launched several columns, including two commanded by Khalid ibn Walid and Ayadh, to raid Byzantine territory in Anatolia as far west as Tarsus. Khalid's objective was Germanicia (Arabic: Marash), the city which lies on a plain at the foot of the Taurus Mountains. The region is best known for its production of salep, a flour made from dried orchid tubers. In late 638, the Muslim army laid the siege to the city which contained a Byzantine garrison. Expecting no help from their Emperor, the Byzantine garrison surrendered the city on the usual terms of Jizya offered by the Rashidun army, which included terms stating that the garrison and the populace be spared. As for material wealth, the Muslims could take all they wished.

== Aftermath ==
It is narrated that Khalid returned to Qinnasrin laden with spoils of war that had seldom been seen before. Many Muslim historians commented that Just the spoils of Marash were sufficient to make the soldiers of this expedition rich for life. Khalid ibn Walid, who was at the peak of his military career was unfortunately dismissed by Caliph Umar because of his immense popularity which was a result of his very successful military career. It was a general view that Umar had dismissed Khalid because he was angry with Khalid, though it was clarified later by Caliph Umar that:

I have not dismissed Khalid because of my anger or because of any dishonesty on his part, but because people glorified him and were misled. I feared that people would rely on him, rather than God, for victory. I want them to know that it is God who does all things; and there should be no mischief in the land.

Khalid was urged by many of his companions to retaliate against Umar for this. Khalid did not, although he was powerful enough to launch a coup d'état against Umar and in effect seize the power of the Rashidun Empire. He instead chose to stay away from politics and died four years later in 642 in Emesa. Caliph Umar was said to have felt embarrassed for his conduct against Khalid and was reported to have said at his death that 'he would have appointed Khalid as his successor if he was still alive.'

== Online resources ==
- A.I. Akram, The Sword of Allah: Khalid bin al-Waleed, His Life and Campaigns Lahore, 1969
