= Akram Dia'a Al-Umari =

Iraqi historian

Akram Dia'a Al-Umari (Arabic: أكرم ضياء العمري) is an Iraqi historian. He holds a PhD in Islamic history, and is a professor of Islamic history and hadith studies. He was awarded the King Faisal Prize for Islamic Studies in 1996.

== Early life and education ==
Al-Umari was born in Mosul, northern Iraq, in 1942. His family subsequently moved to Baghdad.

He completed his undergraduate studies at the College of Education, University of Baghdad, graduating with a bachelor's degree in 1963.

He earned a master's degree in Islamic History from the College of Arts, University of Baghdad.

He received his doctorate in Islamic History from Ain Shams University in Cairo.

== Career ==
He taught at the College of Arts, University of Baghdad, from 1966 for ten years, then moved to the Islamic University of Madinah from 1977 to 1983.

He served as a member of the Scientific Council of the King Fahd Complex for Printing the Holy Qur'an.

He supervised more than sixty doctoral and master's theses and dissertations over the past twenty years at Arab universities, particularly Saudi universities, and examined a large number of them in the fields of Hadith, Islamic history, and Islamic education.

He contributed to the evaluation of numerous scholarly works at various universities, as well as to the academic promotions of many professors at Saudi and Arab universities.

He worked as a professor at the College of Sharia and Law at Qatar University in 1995. He currently serves as a member of the Committee for the Revival of Islamic Heritage and Scientific Publication at the Ministry of Endowments and Islamic Affairs in Qatar.
