= Banu Jadhimah =

Banu Jadhimah (Arabic: بنو جذيمة) was one of the Arabian tribes that interacted with Muhammad.

== History ==
Banu Jadhimah were notorious during the Jahiliyyah (pre-Islamic era) for their extreme violence and were infamously known as "the lickers of blood." Among those they reportedly killed were Al Fakah ibn al-Mughirah and his brother, both uncles of Khalid ibn al-Walid, as well as the father of Abd al-Rahman ibn Awf. They were also responsible for the deaths of Malik ibn al-Sharid and his three brothers from Banu Sulaym in a single incident, along with others from various tribes.

In the year 8 of the Hijrah, Khalid was dispatched by Muhammad to invite the Banu Jadhima to Islam. According to historian Ibn Ishaq, Khalid had persuaded the Jadhima tribesmen to disarm and embrace Islam, which he followed up by executing a number of the tribesmen in revenge for the Jadhima's slaying of his uncle Al-Fakah dating to before Khalid's conversion to Islam. In the narrative of historian Ibn Hajar al-Asqalani and modern scholar Taha Karaan, Khalid asked the tribesmen to accept Islam, they responded by saying, “saba’na, saba’na,” a phrase that literally means “We have become Sabeans,” but which had come to be understood as a general declaration of changing one's religion. However, Khalid misunderstood this response, viewing it as a rejection or denigration of Islam due to his unfamiliarity with the Jadhima's accent. As a result, he ordered their execution. Muhammad declared himself innocent of Khalid's action. He sent Ali ibn Abi Talib to pay compensation to the survivors. Muhammad did not dismiss or punish him and he still gave Khalid command over other expeditions as well.

This continued trust is reflected in Muhammad’s later decision to send Khalid to investigate Banu Mustaliq, a tribe related to Banu Jadhima, after receiving a report from Al-Walid ibn Uqba claiming that they had abandoned Islam. Muhammad instructed Khalid to proceed carefully and not act rashly. Khalid advanced with caution, confirmed that Banu Mustaliq remained committed to Islam, and returned with a truthful report. One of the lessons from this incident is that Khalid’s initial doubts about Banu Jadhima despite belonging to a different clan were not entirely baseless. After all, suspicions concerning the tribe resurfaced just months later, prompting Muhammad to send multiple delegations to investigate their religious commitment.

Ibn Battal stated that an unjust or consensus-contradicting ruling is invalid, but if the mistake comes from ijtihad, as with Khalid, he is not sinful, though compensation (diya) is required, as shown by the Muhammad disavowal of Khalid’s actions while excusing him due to his valid interpretation. Al-Tahawi further clarified that Muhammad did not punish Khalid, affirming that his action was based on an honest mistake rather than intentional wrongdoing. In line with this, Ibn Taymiyyah explained that despite Khalid’s mistake, Muhammad continued to appoint him as a leader, emphasizing that obedient and loyal commanders who err due to a lack of knowledge are corrected but not necessarily removed from authority.

== Bibliography ==
- Crone, P. (1978). "Khālid b. al-Walīd". In van Donzel, E.; Lewis, B.; Pellat, Ch. & Bosworth, C. E. (eds.). The Encyclopaedia of Islam, Second Edition. Volume IV: Iran–Kha. Leiden: E. J. Brill. pp. 928–929. OCLC 758278456.
- Umari, Akram Diya (1991). Madīnan Society at the Time of the Prophet, Volume II: The Jihād against the Mushrikūn. Translated by Huda Khattab. Herndon, Virginia: The International Institute of Islamic Thought. ISBN 0-912463-37-6.
- Watt, W. Montgomery (1956). Muhammad at Medina. Oxford: Clarendon Press. OCLC 3456619.
