= Wadi Qanat =

Seasonal stream in Medina, Saudi Arabia

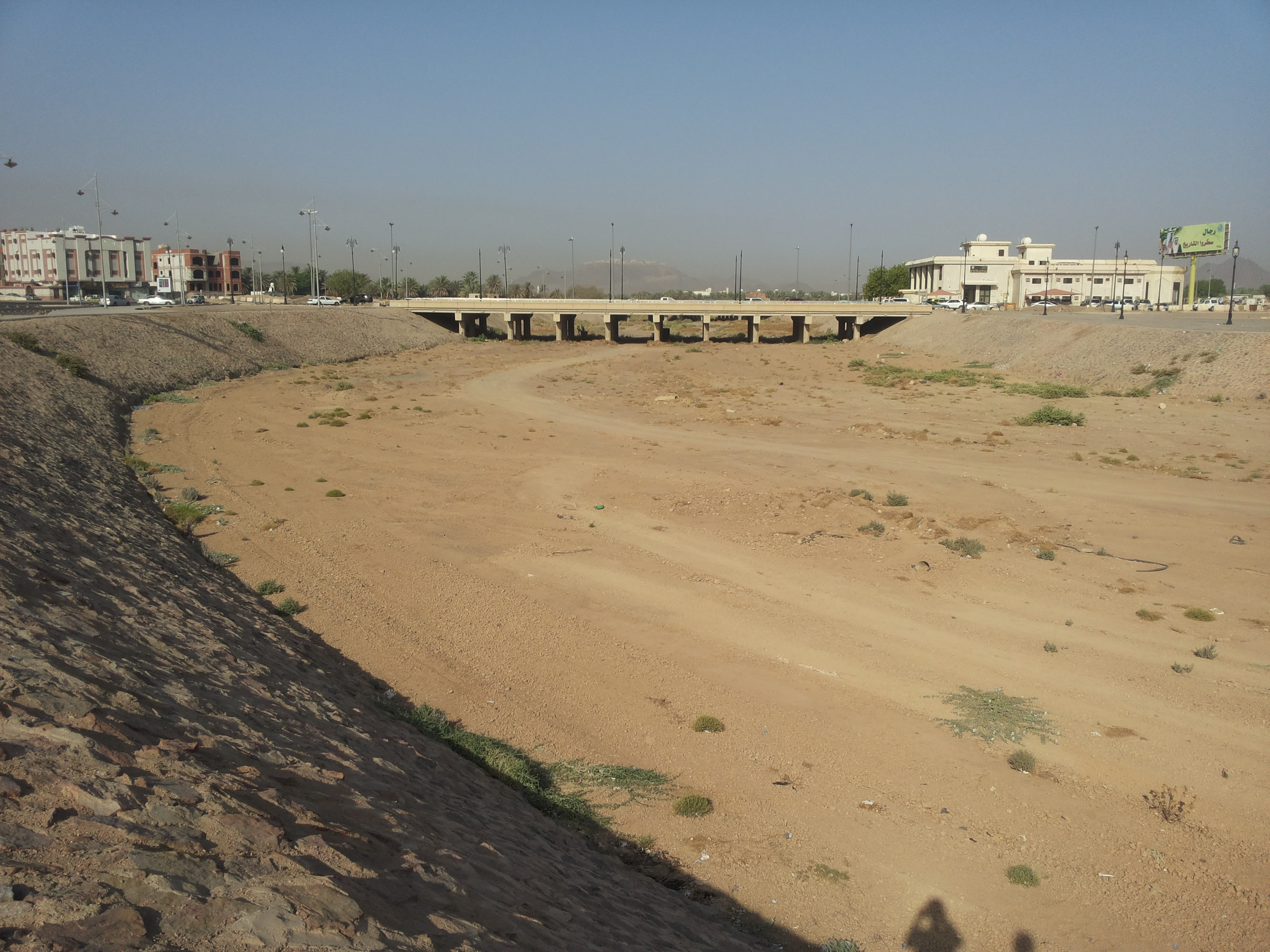

Wadi Qanat, commonly known today as Wadi al-Aqul or Wadi Sayednah Hamzah, is one of three main wadis (seasonal streams) of Medina, Saudi Arabia. It flows between Mount Uhud and the city center of Medina. It connects with the two other major wadis of the city, Wadi Buthan and Wadi al-Aqiq, at a point northwest of Medina. The wadi is dry for most of the year, though it was not uncommon for it to significantly flood when it did fill.

== Bibliography ==
- Elad, Amikam (2016). The Rebellion of Muḥammad al-Nafs al-Zakiyya in 145/762: Ṭālibīs and Early ʿAbbāsīs in Conflict. Leiden: Brill. ISBN 978-90-04-22989-1.
- Munt, Henry (2014). The Holy City of Medina: Sacred Space in Early Islamic Arabia. New York: Cambridge University Press. ISBN 978-1-107-04213-1.
