= Amr ibn Hisham =

Arab polytheist leader (c. 573–624)

- عَمْرو بْنِ هِشَام

Personal details
- Born: c. 573 Mecca, Hejaz
- Died: c. 13 March 624 Badr, Hejaz, Arabia
- Spouse(s): Mujalidya bint Amr; Umm Zurarah bint Umayr; Aisha bint al-Harith; Arwa bint Abi al-As
- Relations: Hantamah (sister) al-Harith (brother); Salama (brother); Ayyash (half-brother) al-Khattab (brother-in-law); Umar (nephew); Fatimah (niece); Abd al-Rahman (nephew); Umm Hakim (niece)
- Children: Ikrima; Zurarah (AKA Abu Hajib); Tamim (AKA Abu ʿAlqama); Alqamah; Al-Hanfa; Sakhrah; Asmaʾ; Juwayriyya
- Parent(s): Hisham ibn al-Mughira (father); Asma bint Mukharraba (mother)

Military service
- Allegiance: Arab polytheists
- Years of service: 624
- Battles/wars: Muslim–Quraysh wars; Battle of Badr (624) †
- Arabic name
- Personal (Ism): ʿAmr عَمْرو
- Patronymic (Nasab): ibn Hisham ibn al-Mughira ibn 'Abd Allāh ibn Umar ibn Makhzum ibn Yaqaza ibn Murrah ibn Ka'b ibn Lu'ayy ibn Ghalib ibn Fihr ibn Malik بن هشام بن المغيرة بن عبد الله بن عمر بن مخزوم بن يقظة بن مرة بن كعب بن لؤي بن غالب بن فهر بن مالك
- Teknonymic (Kunya): Abu Jahl أبو جهل; Abu al-Hakam أبو الحكم
- Epithet (Laqab): Firawn al-Ummah فرعون الأمة
- Toponymic (Nisba): al-Makhzumi المخزومي al-Qurashi القرشي al-Makki المكي al-Hijazi الحجازي

Amr ibn Hisham (Arabic: عَمْرو بن هِشَام, romanized: ʿAmr ibn Hishām), better known as Abu Jahl (Arabic: أبو جهل, lit. 'Father of Ignorance'; c. 573 – 13 March 624) known before Islam as Abu al-Hakam (Arabic: أبو الحكم, lit. 'Father of wisdom'), was the Meccan Qurayshite polytheist leader known for his opposition to the Islamic prophet Muhammad. He was the most prominent flag-bearer of opposition towards Islam.

A prominent head of the Makhzum clan, Amr was known as Abu al-Hakam ('Father of Wisdom') among pre-Islamic Arabs. After Muhammad began preaching monotheism, Amr opposed him and often physically attacked early Muslims. He persecuted many Muslim converts, including Sumayya, and Yasir ibn Amir. His cruel torture methods towards Muslims made Muhammad give him the title Abu Jahl ('Father of Ignorance') and Firawn al-Umma ('Pharaoh of the Nation').

Following the migration to Medina, Amr gathered a large army of polytheists to attack Medina. On 13 March 624, the Battle of Badr took place, in which Amr was a major leader. In the battle, Amr was fatally wounded by Mu'awwidh ibn Amr and Mu'ādh ibn 'Amr and eventually killed by Abd Allah ibn Masud.

== Ancestry and early life ==
Amr was born in Mecca in c. 555. His father was Hisham ibn al-Mughira, an arbitrator of local disputes in Mecca in the Hejaz (western Arabia). He belonged to the Banu Makhzum, a leading clan of the Quraysh tribe and Mecca's pre-Islamic aristocracy. Hisham was known as the 'lord of Mecca' and the date of his death was used by the Quraysh as the start of their calendar. Amr was also called Ibn al-Hanzaliyya, indicating that his mother belonged to the Hanzala tribe.

Genealogical tree of Amr's clan, the Banu Makhzum

Al-Mughira
Hisham (d. 598)	Abu Rabi'a	Al-Walid (d. 622)	Fakih	Abu Umayya
Amr (d. 624)	Al-Harith (d. 639)	Ayyash (d. 636)	Al-Walid (d. 620s)	Hisham	Khalid (d. 642)	Al-Muhajir (fl. 630–633	Umm Salama (d. 680s)	Muhammad
Ikrima (d. 634 or 636)	Abd al-Rahman	Abd Allah	Isma'il	Abd al-Rahman (d. 666)	Muhajir (d. 657)
Salama	Hisham (fl. 691–706)	Khalid (fl. 669)	Khalid
Ayyub

== Biography ==
His epithet was Abū l-Ḥakam (أبو الحكم) (literally "father of wise judgments") as he was considered a man of deep wisdom by the pagans, cunning and understanding by the elders of Quraysh for which they trusted his opinion and relied on him as an elite member of their assembly. Even at the age of thirty, he used to attend the special assemblies held at Dar an-Nadwa, the residence owned by Ḥakīm ibn Ḥizām, although the rule of age of entry to these private assemblies was at least forty.

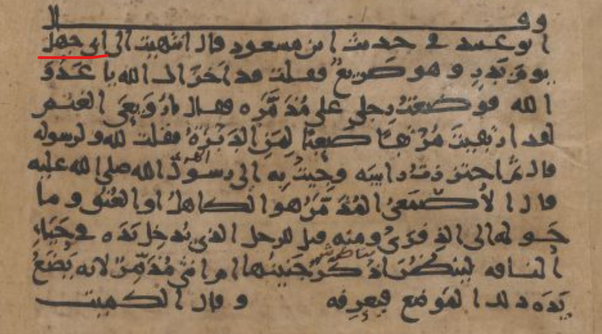
The name of Abu Jahl, highlighted in red. From the hadith manuscript MS. Leiden Or. 298, dated 866 CE.

‘Amr ibn Hishām opposed Muhammad and rejected his teachings. Muhammad, in that context, referred him as Abū Jahl (أبو جهل) (literally "father of ignorance"). Muhammad said, “He who calls Abu Jahl 'Abu Hakam' has made a serious mistake. He should seek forgiveness from Allah for this.” Amr was also known as Asad al-Aḥlāf, "Lion of the Allies", as a staunch representative of the groups that had sworn to fight against Islam and Muhammad. Amr ibn Hisham had a trace of a scar on his knee which helped 'Abdullah ibn Mas'ūd to identify him among the slain and wounded soldiers of Quraysh in the battlefield of Badr. 'Amr ibn Hishām was almost the same age of Muhammad. Once in their youth, they had been pressed together at the table of 'Abdullah ibn Jud'ān at-Taymī. Muhammad was thinner than ibn Hisham and gave him a push which sent him to his knees and one of them was scratched so deeply that it left a permanent scar.

According to Bukhari, 'Amr was among the chieftains that in varying degree kept a "relentless hostility" towards the Muslims. Amr Hishām opposed Muhammad when he began preaching publicly. The following causes of dissension created hostility towards Muhammad:

=== Power struggle between Banū Makhzūm and Banū ‘Abd Manāf ===
Amr ibn Hishām once "secretly" went out by night to listen to Muhammad as he was praying in his house while Abu Sufyan and Al-Akhnas ibn Shurayq also did the same thing. Every one of them chose a place to sit where he could listen, and none knew where his fellow was sitting. So they passed the night listening to him, until as the dawn rose, they dispersed. On their way home they met and reproached one another, and one said to the other, 'Don't do it again, for if one of the light-minded fools sees you, you will arouse suspicion in his mind.' Yet they continued doing this for the next two days.

Amr later told al-Akhnas ibn Sharīq, “We competed with Banū ‘Abd Manāf in everything to attain status and nobility. They fed people, so we also fed people. They gave charity, so we also gave charity. They looked after people; so did we. We did these until we became equal. And now they say, ‘A prophet has come from us who receives revelations from the sky’ How can we possibly be able to compete with this? By Allah, we will never believe in him and we will never accept his message!”

Al-Mughīrah ibn Shu‘bah, a man from aṭ-Ṭā’if, once visited Makkah. He was walking with ibn Hishām in the streets when they came across Muhammad. Muhammad invited ‘Amr ibn Hishām to Islam by saying, “Why don't you accept Islam and believe me as the Messenger of Allah?” ‘Amr ibn Hishām said, “O Muhammad, when are you going to stop cursing our gods? If you want us to testify that you have fulfilled your mission, we will testify for you. And if I knew that you are telling the truth, I would have already followed you.” Muhammad then left. ‘Amr ibn Hishām looked at al-Mughīrah and said, “I know that he is telling the truth, but there is something holding me back. The descendants of Quṣayy ibn Kilāb ibn Murrah [whereas Banū Makhzūm was the descendant of Yaqaẓah ibn Murrah] wanted al-Ḥijābah (Guardianship of al-Ka‘bah & preservation of its key), as-Siqāyah (Custody of Zamzam & catering the pilgrims during the Ḥajj), al-Ifādah (Authority of trade & commerce), al-Liwā’ (Authority of the banner of battles), the authority of armed forces and an-Nadwah (Assembly of the Quraysh). We sacrificed all in favor of them [Banū Makhzūm was only in charge of the cavalry, Khālid ibn Walīd being its commander] and started picking up & competing with them. When we are running neck to neck, they say ‘We have a prophet among us’; How can we compete with that? By Allah, we are never going to accept this.”

=== Persecution of Muslim converts ===
Amr ibn Hisham stirred up the Meccans against the Muslims. When he heard that a man had become a Muslim, if he was a man of social importance and had relations to defend him, he reprimanded him and poured scorn on him, saying, 'You have forsaken the religion of your father who was better than you. We will declare you a blockhead and brand you as a fool, and destroy your reputation.' If he was a merchant he said, 'we will boycott your goods and reduce you to beggary.' If he was a person of no social importance, he beat him and incited people against him. Therefore, many converted slaves had to suffer the "extreme savagery" of Hishām.

It has been told that Amr ibn Hisham often put heavy stones on the backs of his slaves if they made a mistake. Convert slaves belonging to the polytheist Quraysh received the harshest punishment. Hishām beat Ḥarīthah bint al-Mu‘ammil, one such slave, for her conversion to such an extent that she lost her eyesight. He also attacked Sumayya, the mother of ‘Ammār ibn Yasir, and inflicted on her mortal wounds by stabbing her with a spear in her private parts. She was the first Muslim to meet martyrdom in the cause of Islam. Hishām also persecuted Ammar's father Yasir ibn Amir and his brother Abdullah and tortured them to death right in front of his eyes.

Amr ibn Hisham had once clawed at ‘Abdullah ibn Mas‘ūd and punched him in Mecca.

==== The Man from Banu Irāsh ====
The "harassment" of Hishām was not only directed to his own people, but his "misdemeanor" extended to the people outside of Mecca also.

Once a man from the tribe of Irāsh came to Mecca complaining that Hishām had bought some camels from him without paying him back. When the Irāshi man asked people to help him, they referred him to Muhammad with the intention of stirring up an argument. Muhammad brought him to Hishām's house and asked him to give the Irāshi man's money that he owed him. Hishām immediately came back with the money with his face looking extremely pale and timid. The disappointed Quraysh blamed Hishām with sarcasm later on. He said, “Woe unto you all! As soon as I heard the knock on my door, I heard a terrifying sound which filled me with awe. When I looked to see what it was, it was the most colossal and vicious camel I had ever seen towering over my head. By Allah, if I had delayed or refused it would have devoured me alive!”

While Muhammad was in Mecca some twenty Christians came to him from Abyssinia (or Najrān) when they heard news of him. Muhammad answered all their questions and read the Quran to them. Their eyes flowed with tears and they accepted Islam. Hishām intercepted them as they were leaving, saying, 'God, what a wretched band you are! Your people at home sent you to bring them information about the fellow, and as soon as you sat with him you renounced your religion and believed what he said. We don't know a more asinine band than you'. They answered: 'Peace be on you. We will not engage in foolish controversy with you. We have our religion and you have yours. We have not been remiss in seeking what is best.'

==== Hostility to Muhammad ====
According to Islamic scriptures, one day Hishām declared, "I call God to witness that I will wait for him tomorrow with a stone which I can hardly lift and when he prostrates himself in prayer I will split his skull with it. Betray me or defend me, let the Banū 'Abdu Manāf do what they like after that." The Qurayshi people said that they would never betray him on any account, and he could carry on with his project. When morning came Hishām took a stone and sat in wait for Muhammad. The apostle rose to pray while Quraysh sat in their meeting, waiting for what Hishām was to do. When the apostle prostrated himself, Hishām "took up the stone and went towards him, until when he got near him, he turned back in flight, pale with terror, and his hand had withered upon the stone, so that he cast the stone from his hand". The Quraysh asked him what had happened, and he replied that when he got near him a camel's stallion got in his way. "By God", he said, "I have never seen anything like his head, shoulders, and teeth on any stallion before, and he made as though he would eat me."

Narrated ‘Abdullah ibn ‘Abbas: Hishām said, "If I see Muhammad praying at the Ka'ba, I will tread on his neck." When the Prophet heard of that, he said, "If he does so, the Angels will snatch him away."

Narrated 'Abdullah bin Mas'ud: Once the Prophet was offering prayers at the Ka'ba. Hishām was sitting with some of his companions. One of them said to the others, "Who amongst you will bring the entrails of a camel of Bani so and so and put it on the back of Muhammad, when he prostrates?" The most unfortunate of them got up and brought it. He waited till the Prophet prostrated and then placed it on his back between his shoulders. I was watching but could not do anything. I wish I had some people with me to hold out against them. They started laughing and falling on one another. Allah's Apostle was in prostration and he did not lift his head up till Fatima (Prophet's daughter) came and threw that (camel's abdominal contents) away from his back. He raised his head and said thrice, "O Allah! Punish Quraish." So it was 'hard' for Hishām and his companions when the Prophet invoked Allah against them as they had a conviction that the prayers and invocations were accepted in this city (Mecca). The Prophet said, "O Allah! Punish Abu Jahl, 'Utba bin Rabī'a, Shaiba bin Rabī'a, Al-Walīd bin 'Utba, Umaiya bin Khalaf, and 'Uqba bin Abu Mu'īṭ (and he mentioned the seventh whose name I cannot recall). By Allah in Whose Hands my life is, I saw the dead bodies of those persons who were counted by Allah's Apostle in the Qalib (one of the wells) of Badr.

After his nephew Umar converted to Islam, he marched towards the Kaaba with a group of Muslims, including Hamza ibn Abd al-Muttalib. Umar declared his faith in front of the polytheists, and the enraged Amr ibn Hisham send his men to attack Umar. Utbah ibn al-Rabiah was the first to attack Umar, but Umar severely punched Utbah and injured the latter. Umar then openly prayed at the Kaaba, with Amr and Abu Sufyan angrily staring.

The Quran relates that Quraysh polytheists demanded Muhammad to perform most unlikely things possible to prove his prophethood. Once Hishām, along with other leaders including al-Walīd ibn al-Mughīrah, al-‘Āṣ ibn Wā’il, al-‘Āṣ ibn Hishām, Aswad ibn ‘Abd Yaghūth, al-Aswad ibn al-Muṭṭalib, Zam‘ah ibn Aswad, an-Naḍr ibn al-Ḥārith asked Muhammad, “If you truly are a prophet, then split the moon in half so that one half will appear over Mount Abu Qubais and the other over Mount Quayqian.” Muhammad asked, “If I do it, will you become Muslims?” They agreed. On the 14th night, when there was a full moon, Muhammad "prayed to Allah to give him the miracle". When Gabriel, according to Islamic scriptures, informed him that Allah had "granted his prayer", he announced it to the Meccans. The polytheists, according to Islamic scriptures, "witnessed the splitting of the moon". Muhammad shouted to the Muslims: “O Abu Salama ibn ‘Abdu’l Asad! Arqām ibn Abi’l Arqām! Bear witness!” However, the polytheists said “The son of Abu Kabsha cast a spell on you!” Some of them also said: “If Muhammad had cast a spell on us, then he couldn't have cast a spell on everyone! Let us ask the wayfarers who came from the surrounding areas if they saw what we saw.” So when they asked the people they answered that the moon was indeed "split into two". Yet, the polytheists "rejected Islam". “This is a prevalent magic”, they said, “Abū Ṭālib's orphan affected the sky with his spell”. (Ṣaḥīḥ al-Bukhāri 3636, 3638)

Hishām passed by Muhammad at al-Ṣafā, insulted him and behaved most offensively, speaking spitefully of his religion and trying to bring him into disrepute. Muhammad did not speak to him. Now a freedwoman, belonging to 'Abdullah b. Jud'ān b. 'Amr b. Ka'b b. Sa'd b. Taym b. Murra, was in her house listening to what went on. When he went away he betook himself to the assembly of Quraysh at the Ka'ba and sat there. Within a little while Ḥamza b. 'Abdu'I Muṭṭalib arrived, with his bow hanging from his shoulder, returning from the chase, for he was fond of hunting and used to go out shooting. When he came back from a hunt he never went home until he had circumambulated the Ka'ba, and that done when he passed by an assembly of the Quraysh he stopped and saluted and talked with them. He was the strongest man of Quraysh, and the most unyielding. Muhammad had gone back to his house when he passed by this woman, who asked him if he had heard of what ‘Amr b. Hisham had done just recently to his nephew, Muhammad; how he had found him sitting quietly there, and insulted him, and cursed him, and treated him badly, and that Muhammad had answered not a word. Ḥamza was filled with rage, for God purposed to honor him, so he went out at a run and did not stop to greet anyone, meaning to punish Hishām when he met him. When he got to the mosque he saw him sitting among the people, and went up to him until he stood over him, when he lifted up his bow and struck him a violent blow with it, saying, 'Will you insult him when I follow his religion, and say what he says? Hit me back if you can!' Some of Banū Makhzūm got up to go to Hishām's help, but he said, 'Let Abū 'Umāra alone for, by God, I insulted his nephew deeply.'

‘Ayyāsh ibn Abī Rabī‘ah was one of the paternal cousins of ‘Amr ibn Hishām as well as his maternal brother. ‘Ayyāsh was among the early Muslim converts who emigrated to Madīnah before Muhammad. Hishām "devised a plan to bring him back to Makkah". Accordingly, he went to Madīnah with his brother Ḥārith and told ‘Ayyāsh a deceptive story about his mother's illness as a decoy only to provoke his emotion. Hishām also "lied about his mother's making an oath that she would neither sit in the shade nor comb her hair until she saw ‘Ayyāsh again". ‘Umar ibn al-Khaṭṭāb tried to warn him by saying "This is nothing but an attempt of the people to seduce you from your religion so beware of them; for, by Allah, if lice were causing your mother trouble she would use her comb, and if the heat of Mecca oppressed her she would take shelter from it." But ‘Ayyāsh said, "I will clear my mother from her oath; also I have some money there which I can get." ‘Umar told him that he was one of the richest of the Quraysh and he could have half his money if he refused to go with the two men. But when ‘Umar saw that he was determined to go he said, "If you must go, then take this camel of mine. She is well bred and easy to ride. Don't dismount, and if you suspect them of treachery you can escape on her." The three went off and while they were on their way Hishām said, "Nephew, I find my beast hard to ride. Won't you mount me behind you?" When he agreed he and they made their camels kneel to make the change over, and when on the ground they fell on him and bound him securely and brought him to Mecca by day and said, 'O men of Mecca, deal with your fools as we have dealt with this fool of ours.'

The house of the Banu Jaḥsh was locked up when they left and ‘Utba ibn Rabī‘ah, al-‘Abbās ibn ‘Abdu’l-Muṭṭalib and Hishām passed by it on their way to the upper part of Mecca. ‘Utbah looked at it with its doors blowing to and fro, empty of inhabitants, and sighed heavily and said:

“Every house however long its prosperity lasts will one day be overtaken by misfortune and trouble.”

Then 'Utbah went on to say, ‘The house of the Banu Jaḥsh has become tenantless.’ To which Hishām replied, ‘Nobody will weep over that. This is the work of this man's nephew. He has divided our community, disrupted our affairs, and driven a wedge between us.’

=== Boycott of the Banu Hashim ===
As a means of deterring Muhammad from spreading his message, the Quraysh laid a boycott on Banū Hāshim and Banū Muṭṭalib. Hishām, met Ḥakīm ibn Ḥizām with whom was a nephew carrying flour intended for his aunt Khadīja who was with him in the mountain gorge. He hung on to him and said, 'Are you taking food to the Banū Hāshim? By Allah, before you and your food move from here I will denounce you in Mecca.' Abū'l-Bakhtarī (al-‘Āṣ) ibn Hishām came to him and said, 'What is going on between you two?' When he said that Ḥakīm was taking food to the Banu Hāshim, he said: 'It is food he has which belongs to his aunt and she has sent to him about it. Are you trying to prevent him taking her own food to her? Let the man go his way'. Hishām refused until they came to blows, and Abū'I-Bakhtarī (al-‘Āṣ) ibn Hishām took a camel's jaw and knocked him down, wounded him, and trod on him violently.

This situation ultimately created dissension amongst the various Makkan factions, who were tied with the besieged people by blood relations. After three years of blockade and in Muharram, the tenth year of Muhammad's mission, the pact was broken. Hishām ibn ‘Amr, who used to smuggle some food to Banū Hāshim secretly at night, went to see Zuhair ibn Abu Umayyah ibn al-Mughirah, one of Hishām's paternal cousins, and reproached him for resigning to that intolerable treatment meted out to his uncles in exile. The latter pleaded impotence, but agreed to work with Hisham and form a pressure group that would secure the extrication of the exiles. On the ground of motivation by uterine relations, there emerged a group of five people who set out to abrogate the pact and declare all relevant clauses null and void. They were Hishām ibn ‘Amr, Zuhair ibn Abu Umayyah ibn al-Mughirah, Al-Muṭ‘im ibn ‘Adī, Abū'l-Bakhtarī (al-‘Āṣ) ibn Hishām and Zam‘a ibn al-Aswad. They decided to meet in their assembly place and start their self-charged mission from the very precinct of the Sacred House. Zuhair, after circumambulating seven times, along with his colleagues approached the hosts of people there and rebuked them for indulging in the amenities of life whereas their kith and kin of Banū Hāshim were perishing on account of starvation and economic boycott. They swore they would never relent until the parchment of boycott was torn to pieces and the pact broken at once. Hishām, standing nearby, retorted that it would never be torn. Zam‘a was infuriated and accused Hishām of telling lies, adding that the pact was established and the parchment was written without seeking their approval. Abū'l-Bakhtarī intervened and backed Zam‘a. Al-Muṭ‘im bin ‘Adi and Hisham bin ‘Amr attested to the truthfulness of their two companions. Hishām, with a cunning attempt to liquidate the hot argument that was running counter to his malicious goals, answered that the issue had already been resolved sometime and somewhere before. (Ar-Raheeq Al-Makhtum)

=== Plan of assassination and hijrah ===
In the end, Hishām came up with a plan to assassinate Muhammad. Each clan should provide a young, powerful, well-born, aristocratic warrior; that each of these should be provided with a sharp sword; then that each of them should strike a blow at him and kill him. Thus they would be relieved of him, and responsibility for his blood would lie upon all the clans. The Banu 'Abdu Manāf could not fight them all and would have to accept the blood-money which they would all contribute to.

At the news of Muhammad's flight with Abu Bakr, Hishām rushed to the house of Abu Bakr. When interrogated, Abu Bakr's daughter Asma refused to tell him their whereabouts. Hishām, in a "fit rage, slapped her so hard that a few of her teeth came loose and her earring flew off".

As soon as the Quraysh realized that Muhammad had fled with Abū Bakr, they sent a cavalry including Umayyah ibn Khalaf, Abu Lahab and Hishām to chase after them. In their frantic attempt to hunt them down, the Quraysh followed their trails up to Mount Thaor where Muhammad was indeed hiding inside a cave. One of the pursuers suggested checking out the cave but Umayyah ibn Khalaf jested at him and showed the intact cobweb and an undisturbed bird's nest at the mouth of the cave. Hishām was the only one yet to be convinced and said, "By Lāt & ‘Uzzā, I'm sure they're holed up somewhere nearby. They must be watching us now as we look for them. Muhammad has cast a spell on our eyes so we can't see them."

Although Muhammad managed to escape for the time being, Hishām would not give up and declared a bounty of 100 of the finest Arab camels for bringing him dead or alive. Suraqah ibn Malik ibn Ju’shum al-Madlajī raced after Muhammad right away. As he was gaining on them, suddenly the hooves of his stallion sagged in the desert sand and his limbs became paralyzed. So he begged him for mercy. At his entreaty, Muhammad prayed for his relief and let him get away scot-free by making a treaty of maintaining the secrecy of their whereabouts as well as warding off the other pursuers.

When Suraqah was completely certain that Muhammad had reached Madīnah, he returned to Makkah relating his miraculous incident to everyone. Since Suraqah was the leader of Banu Madlaj, Hishām "feared that his tribe would accept Islam" influenced by this story.

So Hishām wrote a letter to the Banu Madlaj tribe warning them of the deviation of Suraqah, despised him for his cowardice and selfishness and advised them to disobey him. Suraqah, however, replied to this letter saying, "O Abu’l Jahal! By Allah, had you witnessed how my horse got pinned into the sand, you also would not doubt the prophethood of Muhammad. I truly see that he will soon dominate all of Arabia and everyone will be his followers!"

=== Before the Battle of Badr ===
Prior to the Battle of Badr, Sa'd ibn Mu‘ādh had visited Mecca once to perform his Umrah with his non-Muslim friend Umayyah ibn Khalaf, when they came across 'Amr. They had an argument, and as it became heated, Sa’d threatened him with stopping the Meccan trade route to Syria and 'Amr informed Umayyah that his life was threatened by Muhammad.

'Abdullah bin Mas'ud narrated:

Sa'd bin Mu‘ādh came to Mecca with the intention of performing 'Umra, and stayed at the house of Umayyah Ibn Khalaf Abi Safwan, for Umayyah himself used to stay at Sa'd's house when he passed by Medina on his way to Sham. Umayyah said to Sad, "Will you wait till midday when the people are (at their homes), then you may go and perform the Tawaf round the Ka'ba?" So, while Sad was going around the Ka'ba, Hishām came and asked, "Who is that who is performing Tawaf?" Sad replied, "I am Sad." Hishām said, "Are you circumambulating the Ka'ba safely although you have given refuge to Muhammad and his companions?" Sad said, "Yes," and they started quarrelling. Umayyah said to Sad, "Don't shout at Abi-l-Hakam, for he is chief of the valley (of Mecca)." Sad then said (to Hishām). 'By Allah, if you prevent me from performing the Tawaf of the Ka'ba, I will spoil your trade with Sham." Umaiya kept on saying to Sa'd, "Don't raise your voice." and kept on taking hold of him. Sa'd became furious and said, (to Umayyah), "Be away from me, for I have heard Muhammad saying that he will kill you." Umaiyya said, "Will he kill me?" Sad said, "Yes." Umaiya said, "By Allah! When Muhammad says a thing, he never tells a lie." Umayyah went to his wife and said to her, "Do you know what my brother from Yathrib (i.e. Medina) has said to me?" She said, "What has he said?" He said, "He claims that he has heard Muhammad claiming that he will kill me." She said, "By Allah! Muhammad never tells a lie." So when the infidels started to proceed for Badr (Battle) and declared war (against the Muslims), his wife said to him, "Don't you remember what your brother from Yathrib told you?" Umayyah decided not to go but Hishām said to him, "You are from the nobles of the valley of Mecca), so you should accompany us for a day or two." He went with them and thus Allah got him killed.

The Meccans would not leave Muhammad at peace even in Madinah. So they sent Hishām leading three hundred riders to "terrorize the Muslims". Muhammad immediately dispatched a group of thirty Muhajirūn led by Ḥamza ibn ‘Abdu’l-Muṭṭalib (Ibn Sa’d, 2: 9). The two parties confronted each other on the seashore in the neighbourhood of aI-‘Īṣ (in the territory of Juhayna) standing face to face in preparation for battle. In the heat of the moment, Majdi ibn 'Amr al-Juhani intervened and compelled them to lay down their arms. He was at peace with both the parties according to a truce. So the encounter ended up without any fight. At this, Hishām showed much regret in a poem composed by him and hoped for a future victory over the Muslims.

When Abu Sufyan ibn Ḥarb sent a distress message to Mecca, the Quraysh marshalled about 1,000 men for battle. Hishām, on the point of his journey to Badr, grabbed the hangings (Ghilāf) of Ka’bah and made an earnest supplication to Allah that He would make whichever party was on the right side victorious.

== Death ==
Hishām's "obstinate attitude" culminated in an actual fight despite several attempts of intimidation by some Quraysh leaders.

Al-Juḥfa Juhaym ibn al-Ṣalt ibn Makhrama ibn al-Muṭṭalib tried to intimidate the Quraysh belligerents from going into battle based on an ominous vision. But Hishām "sardonically" replied, "Here's another prophet from Banū al-Muṭṭalib! He'll know tomorrow if we meet them who is going to be killed!"

When Abū Sufyān ibn Ḥarb saw that he had saved his caravan he sent word to Quraysh, "Since you came out to save your caravan, your men, and your property, and God has delivered them, go back." But Hishām said, "By Allah, we will not go back until we have been to Badr." Badr is the site of one of the Arab fairs where they used to hold a market every year. "We will spend three days there, slaughter camels and feast and drink, wine, and the girls shall play for us. The Arabs will hear that we have come and gathered together, and will respect us in future. So come on!"

Ḥakīm ibn Ḥizām tried to restrain ‘Utbah ibn Rabī‘ah from going to battle based on the report gathered by 'Umayr b. Wahb al-Jumaḥī. On ‘Utbah's counsel, Ḥakīm approached Hishām so that he might put him off. But Hishām scorned his advice by saying, "By Allah, his lungs are swollen (with fear) when he saw Muhammad and his companions. No, by Allah, we will not turn back until Allah decides between us and Muhammad. ‘Utba does not believe his own words, but he saw that Muhammad and his companions are (in number as) the eaters of one slaughtered camel, and his son (i.e. Abū Ḥudhayfa ibn ‘Utbah) is among them, so he is afraid lest you slay him."

Hishām was fatally wounded in the Battle of Badr by Muawwaz ibn ‘Afrā’ and Mu'ādh ibn 'Amr, but was beheaded by Abd Allah ibn Mas'ud.

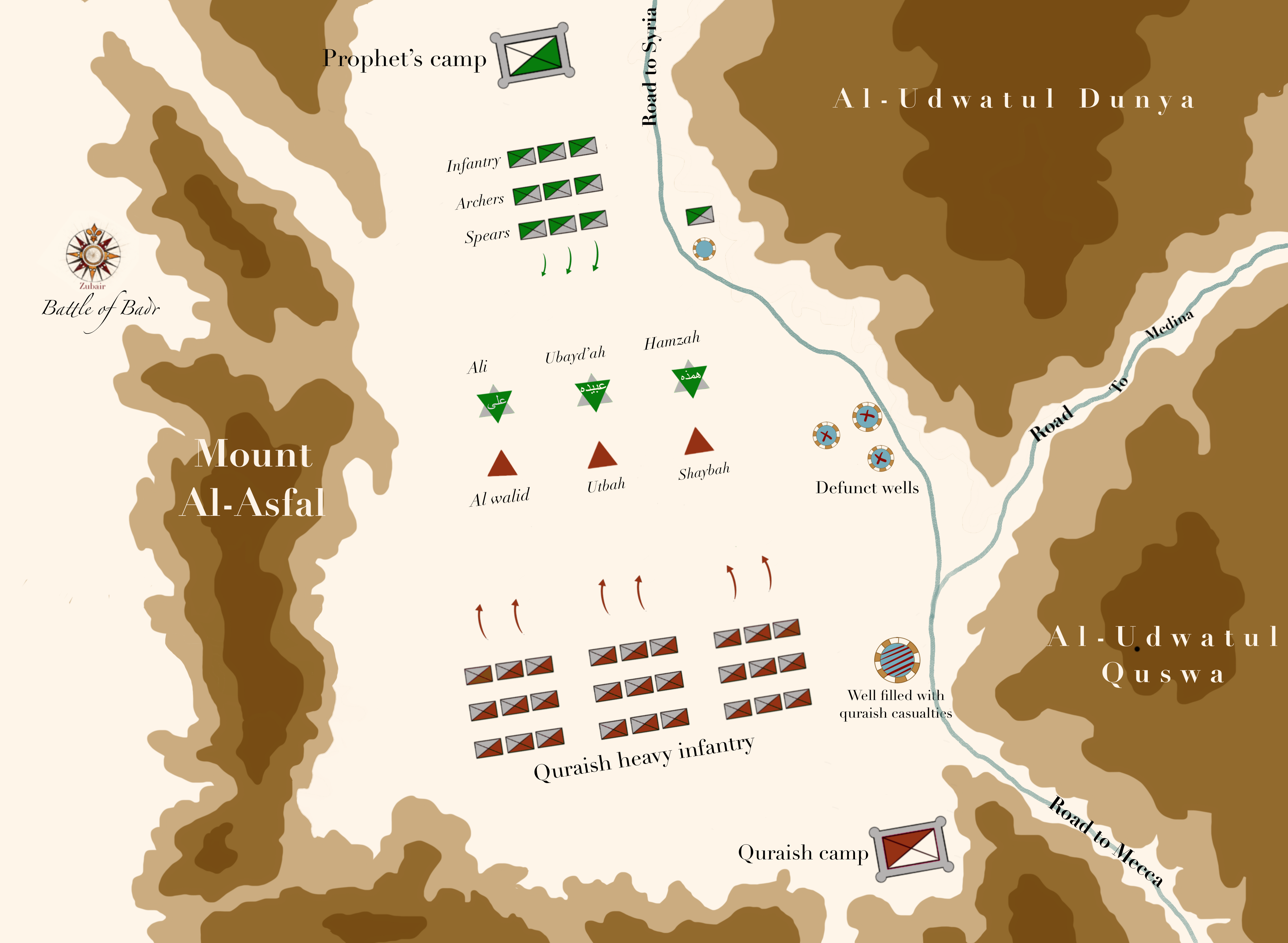
Map of the Muslims and Arab pagans' camps at the Battle of Badr

'Abdur-Rahman bin 'Auf narrated:

While I was standing in the row on the day (of the battle) of Badr, I looked to my right and my left and saw two young Ansari boys, and I wished I had been stronger than they. One of them called my attention saying, "O Uncle! Do you know Abu Jahl?" I said, "Yes, What do you want from him, O my nephew?" He said, "I have been informed that he abuses Allah's Messenger. By Him in Whose Hands my life is, if I should see him, then my body will not leave his body till either of us meet his fate." I was astonished at that talk. Then the other boy called my attention saying the same as the other had said. After a while I saw Abu Jahl walking amongst the people. I said (to the boys), "Look! This is the man you asked me about." So, both of them attacked him with their swords and struck him to death (One of the boy's hand was slain, the hand was dangling so he used his feet to step on the dangling hand and he forcefully removed the hand so that it won't cause him problem in killing Abu Jahl) and returned to Allah's Apostle to inform him of that. Allah's Apostle asked, "Which of you has killed him?" Each of them said, "I Have killed him." Allah's Apostle asked, "Have you cleaned your swords?" They said, "No." He then looked at their swords and said, "No doubt, you both have killed him and the spoils of the deceased will be given to both of you." Later, Mu'awwidh was killed in the battle. So, Mu'adh bin Amr bin Al-Jamuh got Abu Jahl spoils.

Mu'ādh ibn 'Amr ibn al-Jamūḥ said, "I heard the people saying when Abu Jahl was in a sort of thicket, 'Abu' jahal cannot be got at'. When I heard that I made it my business, and made for him. When I got within striking distance I fell upon him and fetched him a blow which sent his foot and half his shank flying. I can only liken it to a date-stone flying from the pestle when it is beaten. His son ‘Ikrima struck me on the shoulder and severed my arm and it hung by the skin from my side, and the battle compelled me to leave him. I fought the whole of the day dragging my arm behind me and when it became painful to me I put my foot on it and standing on it I tore it off." He lived after that into the reign of 'Uthmān.

Mu‘awwidh ibn ‘Afrā’ passed Hishām as he lay there "helpless and smote" him until he left him at his last gasp. He himself went on fighting until he was killed. Then 'Abdullah ibn Mas'ūd passed by Hishām when the Apostle had ordered that he was to be searched for among the slain. 'Abdullah ibn Mas'ūd said that he found him at his last gasp and put his foot on his neck and said to him: "Has God put you to shame?" He replied, "How has He shamed me? Am I anything more remarkable than a man you have killed? Tell me how the battle went." He told him that it went in favor of Allah and His apostle. Hishām said, "You have climbed high, you little shepherd." Then ['Abdullah ibn Mas'ūd] struck off his head and showed his head to Muhammad. When Muhammad saw his lifeless body on the battlefield he said, "This is the Pharaoh of this Ummah."

Upon his death, the people of Quraysh mourned for him and composed elegies and requiems depicting him as a "noble, generous and glorified man".

‘Abdullah ibn ‘Abbās says that 84 verses of the Qur'an were revealed regarding Hishām.

Then Hishām came up to him saying, “Should I not stop you from this?!” So the Messenger rebuked him and warned him to stop harassing him. Hishām then told the Prophet, “Do you threaten me when you know very well that I have the most backing and support than anyone in this valley of Makkah?” These verses were then declared:

9. Do you not see the one who forbids?

10. A slave when he (turns to Allah) to pray?

11. Don't you see if he is on (the road of) Guidance?-

12. Or enjoins Righteousness?

13. Don't you see if he denies (Truth) and turns away?

14. Does he not know that Allah sees him?

15. Let him beware! If he does not stop, We will drag him by the forelock

16. A lying, sinful forelock!

17. Then, let him call (for help) to his council (of comrades):

18. We will call on the angels of punishment (to deal with him)!

19. Nay, heed him not: But bow down in adoration, and bring yourself the closer (to Allah)! (Sūrah al-`Alaq, 96: 9-19) Abu Jahl then backed off hearing these lines. Ibn ‘Abbās says that if Abu Jahl had called his gang to hurt the Messenger, then Allah would have sent upon him the angels of punishment to deal with him.

Once Hishām said to the prophet, ‘By Allah, Muhammad, you will either stop cursing our gods, or we will curse the God you serve.’ So this verse was declared: “Curse not those to whom they pray other than God lest they curse God wrongfully through lack of knowledge.” (Sura 6:108)

When the Qur'an mentioned the tree of al-Zaqqūm to "strike terror into the Quraysh", Hishām asked them, “O Quraysh, do you know what the tree of al Zaqqūm is with which Muhammad would scare you?” When they said that they did not, he said: “It is Yathrib dates buttered. By Allah, if we get hold of them we will gulp them down in one!” The Qur'an later followed with this verse: “Verily the tree of al-Zaqqūm is the food of the sinner like molten brass seething in their bellies like boiling water.” (Sūra 44: 43)

Narrated Anas bin Malik: Abu Jahl said, "O Allah! If this (Qur'an) is indeed the Truth from You, then rain down on us a shower of stones from the sky or bring on us a painful torment." So these verses were declared: "But Allah would not punish them while you were amongst them, nor He will punish them while they seek (Allah's) forgiveness..." (8:33) And why should Allah not punish them while they turn away (men) from Al-Masjid-al-Haram (the Sacred Mosque of Mecca)...?" (8:33-34)

Hishām was "infamous" for his "ruthless attitude" toward orphans as well. 'Amr, who was a custodian of an orphan, "refused to return his belongings once he asked for and drove him away". The Qur'an refers Sūra Mā‘ūn (107:2-3) regarding this act of cruelty.

== Bibliography ==
- Guillaume, Alferd (1955). The Life Of Muhammad : A translation of Ishaq's Sirat Rasul Allah. Oxford University Press. ISBN 0-19-636033-1.
- Hinds, M. (1991). "Makhzūm". In Bosworth, C. E.; van Donzel, E. & Pellat, Ch. (eds.). The Encyclopaedia of Islam, Second Edition. Volume VI: Mahk–Mid. Leiden: E. J. Brill. pp. 137–140. ISBN 978-90-04-08112-3.
