= Umm Hakim bint al-Harith ibn Hisham =

Female companion of Muhammad and wife of Umar

Umm Hakim bint al-Harith
- أم حكيم بنت الحارث
- Born: Mecca, Hejaz, Arabia
- Died: Medina, Hejaz, Rashidun Caliphate
- Other name: Bint Al-Harith
- Known for: Companion of Muhammad, female Muslim warrior, wife of Umar
- Spouses: Ikrima; Abu Sa'id; Umar
- Children: Fatima bint Umar
- Parents: Al-Harith ibn Hisham (father); Fatima bint al-Walid ibn al-Mughira (mother)
- Family: Banu Makhzum (Quraish)
- Military service
- Allegiance: Rashidun Caliphate
- Branch: Caliphate Army
- Conflicts: Battle of Marj al-Saffar (634)

Umm Ḥakīm bint al-Ḥārith ibn Hishām (Arabic: أم حكيم بنت الحارث إبن هشام) was a female disciple (known in Arabic as Sahaba or companions) of Islamic prophet Muhammad. She was a wife of Umar, the second caliph of Islam.

== Biography ==
Umm Hakim was the daughter of al-Harith al-Makhzumi (ibn Hisham ibn al-Mughira ibn Abd Allah ibn Umar ibn Makhzum). Her mother's name was Fatima bint al-Walid ibn al-Mughira ibn Abd Allah ibn Umar ibn Makhzum.

She was the wife of Ikrima ibn Abi Jahl, who was killed in the Battle of the Yarmuk.

=== Drum beating during Battle of Uhud ===
In the battle of Uhud she accompanied Ikrima and other Quraysh of Mecca who fought against the Muslims. She, along with other women, beat drums as they led the group of Quraysh women onto the battlefield.

=== Conquest of Mecca by Muslims and acceptance of Islam ===
In 630 CE, when the Muslims conquered Mecca, Umm Hakim converted to Islam along with the other Quraysh. Subsequently, Umm Hakim convinced her husband Ikrima to convert to Islam.

=== Role in Battle of Marj al-Saffar and Marriage with caliph Umar ===
After Abu Sa'id was killed, Umm Hakim single-handedly killed seven Byzantine soldiers with a tent pole near a bridge near Damascus which is now known as the Bridge of Umm Hakim, during the Battle of Marj al-Saffar in 634. According to another source, she was married to Abu Sa'id Khalid ibn Sa'id on the evening preceding the Battle of Marj al-Saffar. Abu Sa'id was killed in the battle.

Later, she was married to Umar ibn al-Khattab, from whom she had a daughter named Fatima.
