= Abu Umayya ibn al-Mughira =

Early 7th-century Meccan elder

Abū Umayya ibn Al-Mughīra (ابو ٱمية بن المغيرة), whose original name was Suhayl and whose by-name was Zād ar-Rākib ("the Travellers' Provider") was the chief of Mecca in the early seventh century.

== Family ==
He was the son of Mughīrah ibn Abd Allah ibn Umar ibn Makhzūm, hence a member of the Makhzum clan of the Quraysh tribe. Among his brothers were the following.

1. Abu Hudhayfa, old man of Sumayya.
2. Abdullah.
3. Al-As.
4. Azwar.
5. Walīd, father of Khalid ibn al-Walid.
6. Hafs, first husband of Hind bint Utbah.
7. al-Fākih, second husband of Hind bint Utbah.
8. Hishām, father of Amr ibn Hishām.
9. Abu Rabī'ah.

His wives and children included the following.

1. Atika bint Abdul Muttalib, who was from the Hashim clan of the Quraysh and an aunt of Muhammad.
  1. Abdullah
  2. Zuhayr.
  3. Qurayba "the Elder", wife of Zam'a ibn al-Aswad.
  4. Amir
2. Atika bint Amir ibn Rabia, who was from the Firas ibn Ghanam clan of the Kinana tribe.
  1. Umm Salama, a wife of Muhammad.
  2. Hishām,
  3. Mas'ūd
  4. Al-Walid, who was changed to Al-Muhajir by Muhammad.
3. Atika bint Utba ibn Rabia, who was from the Abdshams clan of the Quraysh.
  1. Qurayba "the Younger", a wife of Umar, Abdul-Rahman ibn Abi Bakr and of Muawiyah I successively.

He was a wealthy merchant. He was known as Zad ar-Rakib because on all his journeys he paid the expenses of every person in the company.

== Rebuilding of the Kaaba ==
Abu Umayya was the chief of Mecca at the time when the Kaaba was rebuilt in 605. All the clans of Quraysh shared this task, with the Makhzum clan working on the section between the Black Stone and the southern corner.

Controversy arose over who should have the honour of replacing the Black Stone. The dispute became so severe that for four or five days, all work on the rebuilding ceased. Abu Umayya played a key role in settling the dispute by suggesting that the next man to enter the gate should be appointed umpire. The Quraysh agreed to this. As it happened, the next man to walk in was the future prophet Muhammad. The Quraysh were pleased, saying, "This is the Trustworthy One. We are satisfied. This is Muhammad." He settled the dispute by placing the Black Stone on a cloak. Representatives from each clan took one corner, and they lifted the cloak together. Muhammad then placed the stone with his own hand.
