= Hind bint Amr =

Companion (Sahabiyyah) of Muhammad

- هند بنت عمرو
- Born: Hejaz, Arabia
- Died: Medina, Arabia
- Known for: Companion (Sahabiyyah) of the Prophet
- Spouse: Amr ibn al-Jamuh
- Children: Muawwaz ibn Amr; Muaaz ibn Amr; Khallad ibn Amr

Hind bint Amr ibn Haram (Arabic: هند بنت عمرو بن حرام) was a sahaba, or companion, of the Islamic prophet Muhammad.

She was married to Amr ibn al-Jamuh, one of the chieftains of the Banu Salmah clan in Medina.

Her husband was an ardent devotee of the deity Manāt, one of the three chief goddesses of Mecca and he had a wooden image of the idol in his prayer room, made of fine materials, an idol which he used to perfume and take good care of.

Hind and her three sons Muawwaz ibn Amr, Muaaz ibn Amr and Khallad ibn Amr adopted Islam after hearing the Dawah of Masab ibn Umair, but all four kept their faith a secret from Amr.

Her husband was unaware of her new religion and had warned her of the "danger" posed by Masab to the traditional faith of Medina and asked her to guard their sons against it. Hind advised him to listen to what their second son Muaaz had to tell them, Muaaz then recited the surah Fatihah. The recitation made an impact on her husband, but he was reluctant to abandon Manāt.

After much prayer, and the repeated theft of the statue by his sons, Amr decided that Manāt was not worthy of worship and also adopted Islam.
