= Amr ibn al-Jamuh =

Companion (Sahabi) of Muhammad

- عمرو بن جموح
- Born: Hejaz, Arabia
- Died: 19 March 625; Uhud, Arabia
- Resting place: Medina
- Known for: Companion (Sahabi) of the Prophet
- Spouse: Umm al-Muawwaz Hind
- Children: Muawwaz ibn Amr, Muaaz ibn Amr, Khallad ibn Amr
- Father: Jamuh
- Family: Banu Salama (tribe)

ʿAmr ibn al-Jamūḥ (Arabic: عمرو بن الجموح) was an ansari companion of Muhammad, and a chief of Banu Salama. He died in the Battle of Uhud.

Amr ibn al-Jamuh was the chief of Bani Salama. He used to have a special idol he worshipped called Manaf. When Mus'ab ibn Umayr arrived in Madina as the Prophet’s ambassador, the four sons of Amr Ibn Al Jamuh and his wife Hind, all accepted Islam. His sons were amongst the 70 companions who gave the Prophet their pledge of allegiance in the Great Aqaba pledge. Amr Ibn Al Jamuh was a sixty-year-old man. He was afraid his children would accept Islam. His son Mu’adh Ibn Amr recited Surah Fatiha to his dad one day, which sparked his interest in Islam. His sons and their friend, Mu’adh Ibn Jabal, concocted a plan to secretly throw Manaf in the dump. When Amr Ibn Al Jamuh found his idol in the dump, he got very upset, removed it, cleaned it and returned it back to its place. Over the next few nights, his sons and their friend repeatedly threw Manaf in the dump until one day; Amr Ibn Al Jamuh placed a sword with Manaf and asked the idol to protect itself. When he saw the idol in the dump once again, he realised his error. He became a devout Muslim and wished to participate in the Battle of Uhud but his sons refused, especially considering Amr was incapacitated in one leg. Amr complained to the Prophet until the permission to fight was granted. Amr fought until he was martyred.

The martyrs of Uhud were not washed, their armour and leather clothes were removed and they were buried. Abdullah bin Amr bin Haram was buried with Amr Ibn Al Jamuh in one grave due to the affection they had for each other; and Hamza was buried with Abdullah bin Jahsh who was his nephew.

== See also ==
- List of Sahabah
