= Mughira =

Mughira is a male Arabic name.

Its meaning is "attacker/raider".

Mughira as a given name or a surname can be associated with:

- Mughira ibn Shu'ba: a prominent companion of Muhammad and was known as one of the four 'shrewds of the Arabs' (duhat al-Arab).
- Mughirah ibn Abd-Allah: a preeminent leader of the Quraysh tribe's Banu Makhzum clan in Mecca in the 6th century. His descendants, the Banu al-Mughira, became the principle house of the Makhzum.
- Walid ibn al-Mughira: the chief of the Banu Makhzum clan of the Quraysh tribe. His clan was responsible for warfare related matters.

A derivative of the name Mughira (also spelled Moughera), is mentioned in Surah al-'Adiyat (chapter 100) verse 3 as well; فَالْمُغِيرَاتِ صُبْحًا, (translation; By the chargers at dawn), referring to the early morning military charge during war.
