= Verse of purification =

Verse in the Quran about the status of purity of the Ahl al-Bayt

The Verse of purification (Arabic:آية التطهير) refers to verse 33:33 of the Quran, the central religious text in Islam. The verse concerns the status of purity of the Ahl al-Bayt (lit. 'people of the house'), the last passage of which reads:

God only desires (innama yuridu llahu) to remove defilement (rijs) from you, O Ahl al-Bayt, and to purify you completely.

The most prominent members of the Ahl al-Bayt are the Islamic prophet Muhammad, his daughter Fatima, his cousin and son-in-law Ali, their sons Hasan and Husayn, followed by the Twelve Imams. Muslims disagree as to who belongs to the Ahl al-Bayt and what political privileges or responsibilities they have. Shia Islam limits the Ahl al-Bayt to the Muhammad, his daughter Fatima, her husband Ali, their two sons Hasan and Husayn, and the Twelve Imams. There are various views in Sunni Islam, though a typical compromise is to include also Muhammad's wives in the Ahl al-Bayt. The verse of purification is regarded by Shia Muslims as evidence of the infallibility of the Ahl al-Bayt. However, given the context of the verse, most scholars, both Sunni and Shia alike would agree that Muhammad's wives are specifically being addressed as Ahl al-Bayt in this verse.

== Rijs ==
The Islamic philosopher Hossein Nasr and his coauthors define spiritual defilement (rijs) as all evil deeds and false beliefs that arise from the 'sickness of the heart', another Quranic expression that appears for instance in verse 9:125. In their view, the verse of purification can thus be interpreted as God’s wanting to remove any incorrect action or belief from the Ahl al-Bayt (lit. 'people of the house') and to bestow upon them infallibility (isma), that is, the innate protection against all false beliefs or evil deeds. They define isma as a God-given consciousness that overrides all other human faculties, so that a person endowed with isma is completely protected from going astray and committing sins.

=== Shia view ===
The Twelver exegete Shaykh Tusi (d. 1067) notes that the article innama in the verse of purification grammatically limits the verse to the Ahl al-Bayt. He then argues that rijs here cannot be limited to disobedience because God expects obedience from every responsible person (Arabic: مكلف, romanized: mukallaf) and not just the Ahl al-Bayt. The verse must therefore refer to the infallibility of the Ahl al-Bayt, he concludes. The argument of the Shia theologian Sharif al-Murtaza (d. 1044) is similar. He contends that God's desire in the verse of purification cannot be a mere desire because God desires the spiritual purification of every responsible person. Therefore, God's desire in this verse must have been followed by action, that is, the action of purifying the Ahl al-Bayt and ensuring their infallibility. Another argument in this vein is presented by the contemporary Twelver jurist Ja'far Sobhani.

== Ahl al-Bayt ==
=== Inclusion of the Ahl al-Kisa ===
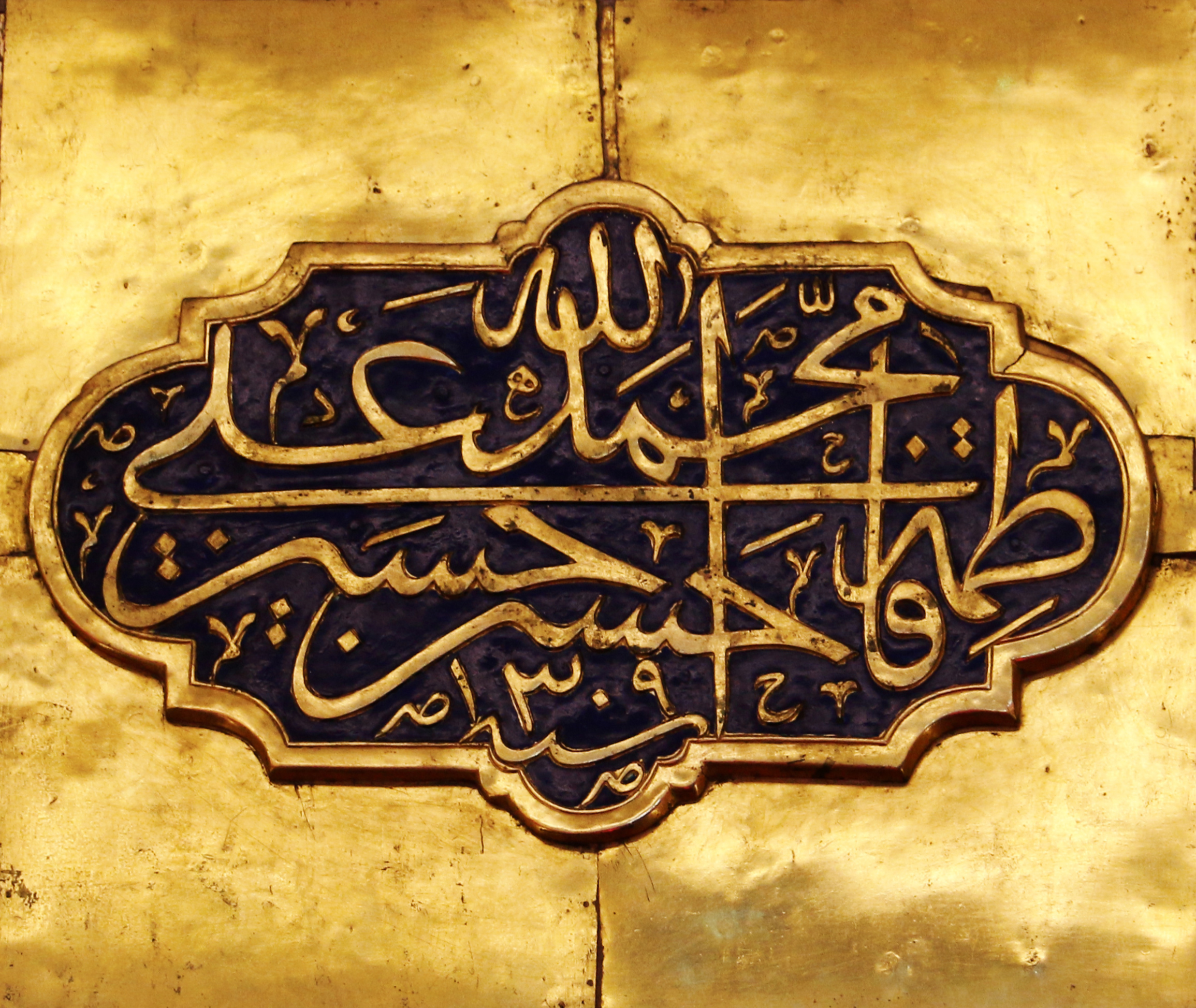
Names of the Ahl al-Kisa, inscribed at the Al-Abbas Shrine, in Karbala.

The majority of the traditions quoted by the Sunni exegete al-Tabari (d. 923) identify the Ahl al-Bayt with the Ahl al-Kisa, namely, Muhammad, his daughter Fatima, her husband Ali, and their two sons, Hasan and Husayn. Such reports are also cited in Sahih Muslim, Sunnan al-Tirmidhi, Musnad Ahmad ibn Hanbal, all canonical Sunni collections of hadith, and by some other Sunni authorities, including al-Suyuti (d. 1505), al-Hafiz al-Kabir, al-Hakim al-Nishapuri (d. 1014), and Ibn Kathir (d. 1373).

In possibly the earliest version of the hadith of the kisa, Muhammad's wife Umm Salama relates that he gathered Ali, Fatima, Hasan, and Husayn under his cloak and prayed, "O God, these are my ahl al-bayt and my closest family members; remove defilement from them and purify them completely." Some accounts continue that Umm Salama then asked Muhammad, "Am I with thee, O Messenger of God?" but received the negative response, "Thou shalt obtain good. Thou shalt obtain good." Among others, such reports are given in Sunnan al-Tirmidhi, Musnad Ahmad ibn Hanbal, and by Ibn Kathir, al-Suyuti, and the Shia exegete Muhammad H. Tabatabai (d. 1981). Yet another Sunni version of this hadith appends Umm Salama to the Ahl al-Bayt. In another Sunni version, Muhammad's servant Wathila bint al-Asqa' is also counted in the Ahl al-Bayt.

Elsewhere in Musnad Ahmad ibn Hanbal, Muhammad is said to have recited the last passage in the verse of purification every morning when he passed by Fatima's house to remind her household of the morning prayer. In his mubahala (lit. 'mutual cursing') with a delegation of Najrani Christians, Muhammad is also believed to have gathered the above four under his cloak and referred to them as his ahl al-bayt, according to Shia and some Sunni sources, including Sahih Muslim and Sunan al-Tirmidhi. This makeup of the Ahl al-Bayt is echoed by the Islamicist Laura Veccia Vaglieri (d. 1989), and also reported unanimously in Shia sources. In Shia theology works, the Ahl al-Bayt often also includes the remaining Shia imams. The term is sometimes loosely applied in Shia writings to all descendants of Ali and Fatima.

=== Inclusion of Muhammad's wives ===
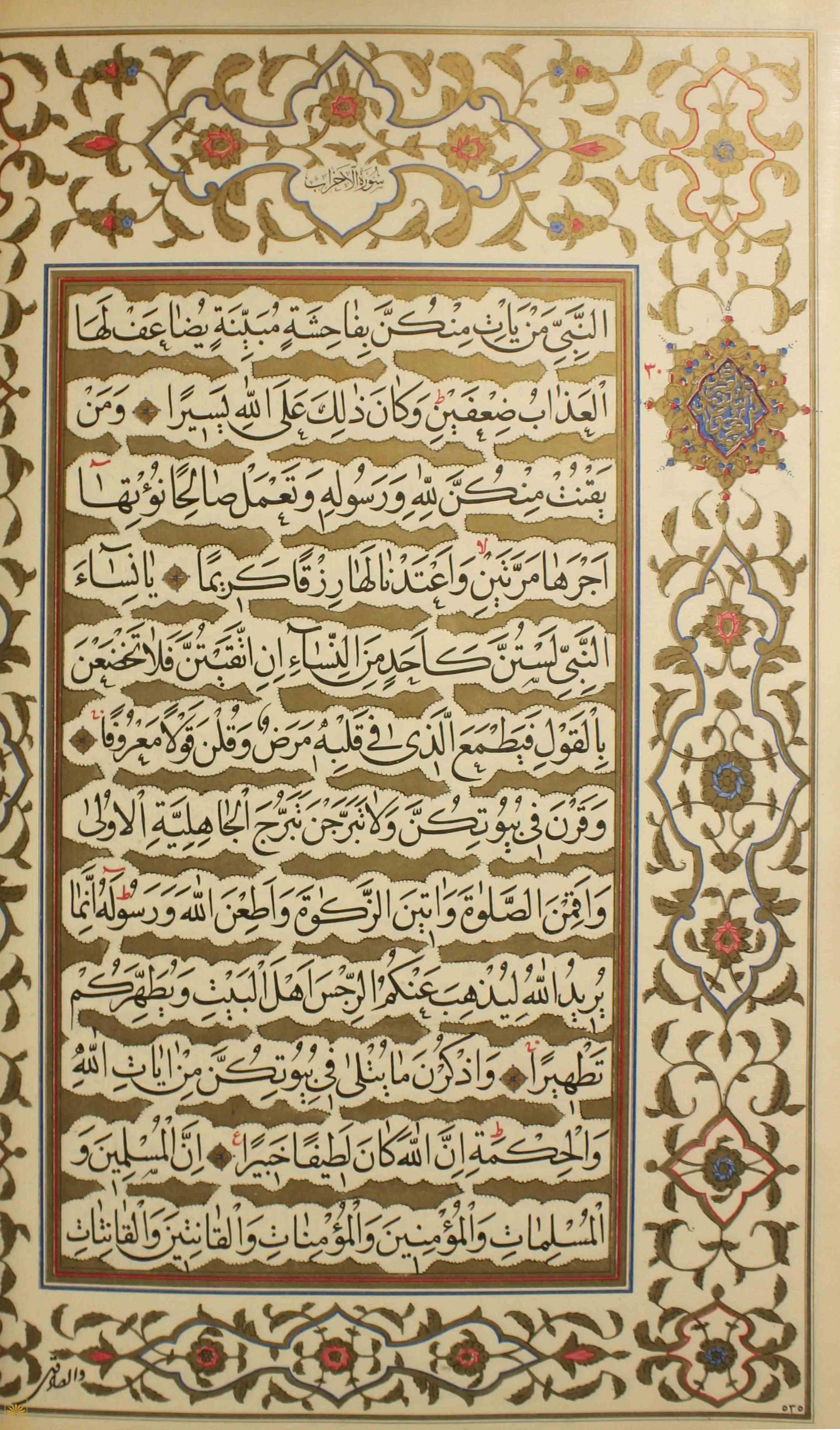
Verse of purification in a folio of the Quran, dating to the late Safavid period

Perhaps because the earlier injunctions in the verse of purification are addressed at Muhammad's wives, some Sunni authors, such as al-Wahidi (d. 1075), have exclusively interpreted the Ahl al-Bayt as Muhammad's wives. Others have noted that the last passage of this verse is grammatically inconsistent with the previous injunctions (masculine plural versus feminine plural pronouns). Thus the Ahl al-Bayt is not or is not limited to Muhammad's wives. Ibn Kathir, for instance, includes Ali, Fatima, and their two sons in the Ahl al-Bayt, in addition to Muhammad's wives. Indeed, certain Sunni hadiths support the inclusion of Muhammad's wives in the Ahl al-Bayt, including some reports on the authority of Ibn Abbas and Ikrima, two early Muslim figures.

Alternatively, the Islamicist Oliver Leaman proposes that marriage to a prophet does not guarantee inclusion in his ahl al-bayt. He argues that, in verse 11:73, Sara is included in Abraham's ahl al-bayt only after receiving the news of her imminent motherhood to two prophets, Isaac and Jacob. Likewise, Leaman suggests that Moses' mother is counted as a member of ahl al-bayt in verse 28:12, not for being married to Imran, but for being the mother of Moses. Similarly, in their bid for inclusion in the Ahl al-Bayt, the Abbasids argued that women, noble and holy as they may be, could not be considered a source of pedigree (nasab). As the descendants of Muhammad's paternal uncle Abbas, they claimed that he was equal to Muhammad's father after the latter died.

=== Broader interpretations ===
As hinted above, some Sunni authors have broadened its application to include in the Ahl al-Bayt the clan of Muhammad (Banu Hashim), the Banu Muttalib, the Abbasids, and even the Umayyads, who had descended from Hashim's nephew Umayya. Indeed, another Sunni version of the Hadith al-Kisa is evidently intended to append the Abbasids to the Ahl al-Bayt. This Abbasid claim was in turn the cornerstone of their bid for legitimacy. Similarly, a Sunni version of the hadith of the thaqalayn defines the Ahl al-Bayt as the descendants of Ali and his brothers (Aqil and Jafar), and Muhammad's uncle Abbas.

The first two Rashidun caliphs, Abu Bakr and Umar, have also been included in the Ahl al-Bayt in some Sunni reports, as they were both fathers-in-law of Muhammad. Nevertheless, these and the accounts about the inclusion of the Umayyads in the Ahl al-Bayt might have been later reactions to the Abbasid claims to inclusion in the Ahl al-Bayt and their own bid for legitimacy. The term has also been interpreted as the Meccan tribe of Quraysh, or the whole Muslim community. For instance, the Islamicist Rudi Paret (d. 1983) identifies bayt (lit. 'house') in the verse of purification with the Kaaba, located in the holiest site in Islam. However, his theory has only found few supporters, notably Moshe Sharon, another expert.

=== Conclusion ===
A typical Sunni compromise is to define the Ahl al-Bayt as the Ahl al-Kisa (Muhammad, Ali, Fatima, Hasan, Husayn) together with Muhammad's wives, which might also reflect the majority opinion of medieval Sunni exegetes. Among modern Islamicists, this view is shared by Ignác Goldziher (d. 1921) and his coauthors, and mentioned by Sharon, while Wilferd Madelung (d. 2023) also includes the Banu Hashim in the Ahl al-Bayt in view of their blood relation to Muhammad. In contrast, Shia limits the Ahl al-Bayt to Muhammad, Ali, Fatima, Hasan, and Husayn, pointing to authentic traditions in Sunni and Shia sources. Their view is supported by Veccia Vaglieri and Husain M. Jafri (d. 2019), another expert.

== Significance in Shia Islam ==
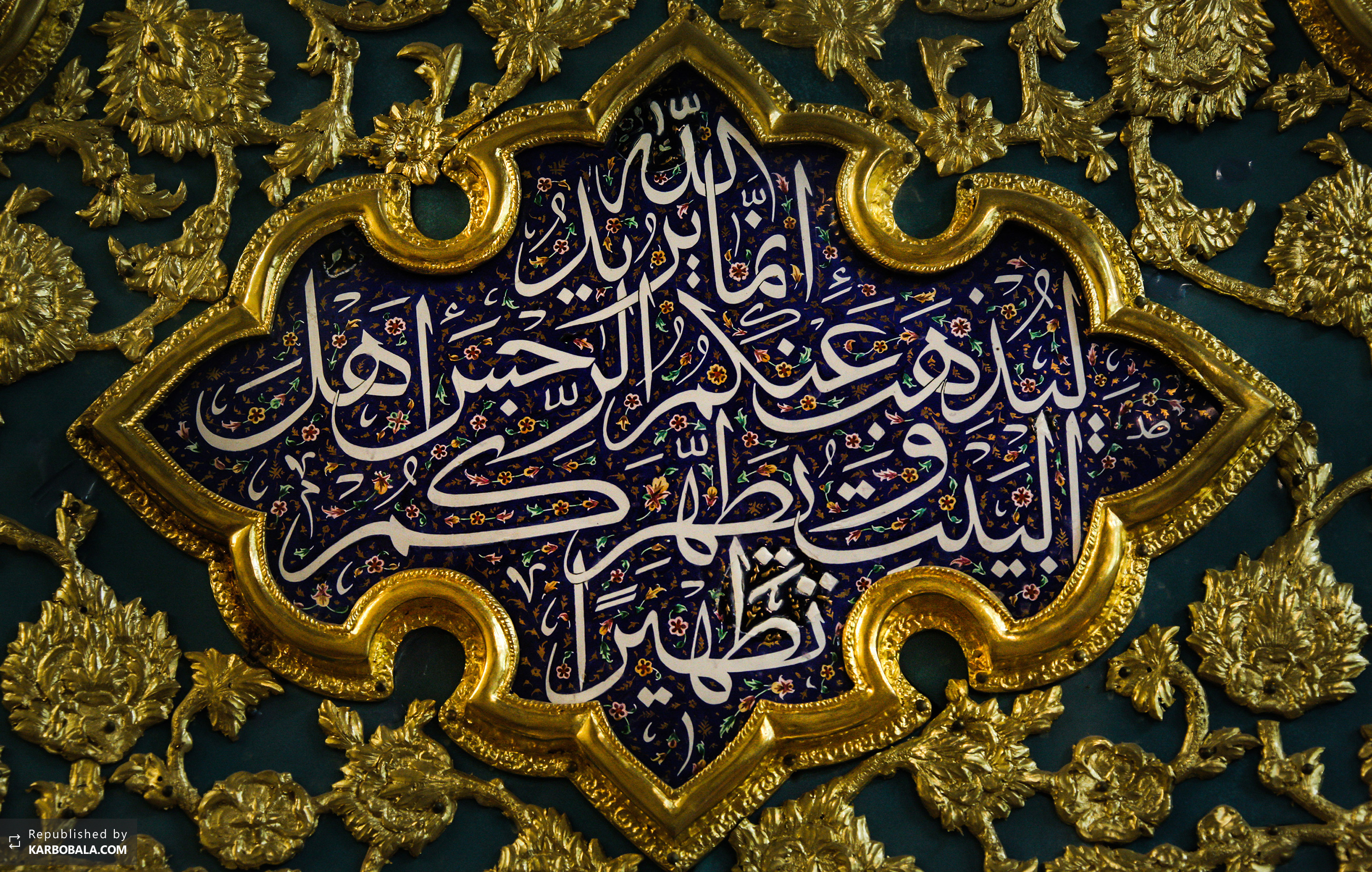
Verse of purification, inscribed in the shrine of Husayn in Karbala, Iraq

The verse of purification has long been regarded by the Shia as evidence for the infallibility of the Ahl al-Bayt. Ali cited this verse when he introduced Hasan as his successor from his deathbed in 661, according to the Shia-leaning historian al-Ma'sudi (d. 956) in his Muruj. Among others, the Sunni historian al-Baladhuri (d. 892) quotes Hasan in his Ansab as referring to this verse in his inaugural speech as the new caliph,

I am of the family of the prophet (ahl al-bayt) from whom God has removed filth and whom He has purified, whose love He has made obligatory in His Book (Quran) when He said: "Whosoever performs a good act, We shall increase the good in it." Performing a good act is love for us, the family of the prophet.

— Hasan ibn Ali

In Twelver Shia, infallibility (isma) is considered a necessary trait for their imams as the divine guides after the prophet, lest their followers would be led astray. In addition to logical arguments, the textual basis for the infallibility of their imams includes the Quranic verse, "My covenant embraceth not the evildoers." This notion was included in Shia teachings as early as the Shia imam Muhammad al-Baqir (d. c. 732).

== See also ==
- Ahl al-Kisa
- Verse of mawadda
- Verse of ikmal al-din
- Verse of walaya
- Verse of obedience
- Hasan ibn Ali in the Quran and Hadith
- Husayn ibn Ali in the Quran and Hadith
