= Al-Harith ibn Hisham =

Companion of Muhammad

- Spouse: Fatima bint al-Walid ibn al-Mughira
- Children: Abd al-Rahman; Umm Hakim
- Father: Hisham ibn al-Mughira
- Relatives: Amr ibn Hisham; Salama ibn Hisham(brother)

Al-Ḥārith ibn Hishām ibn al-Mughīra ibn ʿAbd Allāh (died 634, 636 or 639), was a companion of Muhammad, a noble of the Banu Makhzum and a participant in the Muslim conquest of Syria until his death.

== Life ==
Al-Harith was a son of the prominent pre-Islamic Qurayshite Hisham ibn al-Mughira of the Banu Makhzum clan in Mecca. Al-Harith's brother was Abu Jahl, the leader of Meccan opposition to the Islamic prophet Muhammad until his death at the Battle of Badr in 624. Al-Harith also fought against the Muslims at Badr and again at the Battle of Uhud near Medina in 627. Al-Harith embraced Islam during Muhammad's conquest of Mecca in 629/30. Afterward, he fought in the Muslim army against the Arab polytheists at the Battle of Hunayn in 630 and was given a share of the war spoils from that engagement.

Al-Harith participated in the Muslim conquest of Syria, successively fighting in the battles of Ajnadayn in Palestine and Fahl in Transjordan, both in 634. He fought under his paternal first cousin Khalid ibn al-Walid at the Battle of Yarmouk in 636. In 637 Caliph Umar gave al-Harith a stipend lower than others in the army because of his relatively late conversion to Islam. Unhappy with his pay, he permanently established himself in Syria with seventy members of his family. Accounts in the traditional Islamic sources about the date and cause of his death vary, with a number of sources reporting that he died in battle at Ajnadayn in 634 or at Yarmouk in 636, while others holding that he died in the plague of Amwas in 639. In any case, by the latter date, all but two or four of his seventy family members had died in Syria, in battle or due to plague.

== Descendants ==
One of al-Harith's few surviving sons, Abd al-Rahman, was brought back to Medina by Umar, one of whose wives had been al-Harith's daughter Umm Hakim, and rewarded him with an allotment of land. He fathered an influential family of the Makhzum in Medina, having thirteen or fourteen sons and eighteen daughters. The family forged marital ties with other families of the Makhzum, as well as with the Umayyads and the Zubayrids, both Qurayshite contenders for control of the caliphate during the First and Second Muslim Civil Wars.

The Shihab dynasty, the former ruling house in Ottoman-era Mount Lebanon are purported descendants of al-Harith ibn Hisham.

== Bibliography ==
- Blankinship, Khalid Yahya, ed. (1993). The History of al-Ṭabarī, Volume XI: The Challenge to the Empires. SUNY Series in Near Eastern Studies. Albany, New York: State University of New York Press. ISBN 978-0-7914-0851-3.
- Friedmann, Yohanan, ed. (1992). The History of al-Ṭabarī, Volume XII: The Battle of al-Qādisīyyah and the Conquest of Syria and Palestine. SUNY Series in Near Eastern Studies. Albany, New York: State University of New York Press. ISBN 978-0-7914-0733-2.
- Hinds, M. (1991). "Makhzūm". In Bosworth, C. E.; van Donzel, E. & Pellat, Ch. (eds.). The Encyclopaedia of Islam, Second Edition. Volume VI: Mahk–Mid. Leiden: E. J. Brill. pp. 137–140. ISBN 978-90-04-08112-3.
- Hitti, Philip Khuri (1916). The Origins of the Islamic State, Being a Translation from the Arabic, Accompanied with Annotations, Geographic and Historic Notes of the Kitâb Fitûh Al-buldân of Al-Imâm Abu-l Abbâs Ahmad Ibn-Jâbir Al-Balâdhuri, Volume 1. New York and London: Columbia University & Longman, Green & Co.
