= Banu Makhzum =

Sub-tribe of the Quraysh Tribe

Banū Makhzūm (Arabic: بنو مخزوم)
- Quraysh, Adnanites
- Nisba: Makhzūmī
- Location: Mecca
- Descended from: Makhzum ibn Yaqaza
- Religion: Islam

The Banu Makhzum (Arabic: بنو مخزوم, romanized: Banū Makhzūm) was one of the wealthy clans of the Quraysh. They are regarded as being among the three most powerful and influential clans in Mecca before the advent of Islam, the other two being the Banu Hashim (the tribe of the Prophet Muhammad) and the Banu Umayya.

== History ==
=== Pre-Islamic era ===
The Banu Makhzum were a major clan of the larger Quraysh tribal grouping which dominated Mecca. Though in Arab genealogical tradition, there are some twenty branches descended from the progenitor Umar ibn Makhzum, the line of al-Mughira ibn Abd Allah ibn Umar ibn Makhzum emerged as the principal family of the Banu Makhzum. According to the historian Martin Hinds, the "extent of the power and influence of Makhzum in Mecca during the 6th century A.D. cannot be established with any certainty". Based on the traditional Arabic sources, they formed part of the Ahlaf ("allies") faction of the Quraysh alongside the clans of Abd al-Dar, Banu Sahm, Banu Jumah and Banu Adi, in rivalry to the clans of the Banu Hashim and Banu Abd Shams. Toward the end of the 6th century, a scion of the Makhzum, Hisham ibn al-Mughira, grew to such prominence in Mecca that the Quraysh established a dating system that began with his death. His family, the Banu Hisham, thenceforth became the leading house of the Mughira line of the Makhzum. At the time, Hisham, his brothers al-Walid, Hashim and Abu Umayya and a number of their sons dominated Meccan trade with Yemen and Ethiopia.

=== Early Islamic era ===
The Banu Makhzum were among the foremost opponents of the Islamic prophet Muhammad in Mecca in the early 7th century. One of their chieftains, Abu Jahl, led Meccan opposition to the Muslims and organized a boycott of Muhammad's clan, the Banu Hashim, in circa 616–618. The Muslims gained the advantage at the Battle of Badr, inflicting heavy losses on the Makhzum, with seven or eight nobles from the al-Mughira line slain and a roughly equal number from other cadet lines of the clan. The casualties the Makhzum sustained led to a significant weakening of their position in Mecca and they were passed in prominence by the Banu Abd Shams under the leadership of Abu Sufyan. At least three members of the Makhzum, all from cadet branches, fought alongside Muhammad at Badr, and by the time he launched his conquest of Mecca in January 630, several others had defected to him, including one of their eminent military commanders, Khalid ibn al-Walid, a grandson of al-Mughira. Nonetheless, among the most ardent opponents of negotiations with Muhammad was Ikrima, the son of Abu Jahl and principal leader of the clan. Khalid participated in the city's conquest and Ikrima subsequently fled to Yemen. The leaders who remained, i.e. al-Harith ibn Hisham of the al-Mughira line and Sa'id ibn Yarbu of the cadet branches, reconciled with Muhammad and the Banu Makhzum formed part of the nascent Muslim order.

Muhammad died in 632 and Ikrima was meanwhile pardoned and played an active role, along with Khalid, in the suppression of the Arab tribes that defected from the Muslim state after Muhammad's death in the Ridda wars (632–633). Ikrima later died fighting Byzantine forces, possibly at the Battle of Ajnadayn, while other members of the Makhzum, al-Muhajir ibn Abi Umayya and Abd Allah ibn Abi Rabi'a ibn al-Mughira served various terms as governors of part or all of Yemen under the caliphs Abu Bakr (r. 632–634) and Umar (r. 634–644). The most prominent role by a member of the Makhzum during this period was played by Khalid who scored key victories against Musaylima in the Yamama during the Ridda wars and against the Byzantines during the Muslim conquest of Syria (634–638). His son Abd al-Rahman was appointed governor of Homs and the Jazira and fought reputably against the Byzantines. The forty or so male descendants of Khalid died in a plague in Syria toward the end of Umayyad rule.

== Genealogical tree of key members ==
Abbreviated tree of the Banu Makhzum clan of the Quraysh tribe

Abd Allah ibn Umar ibn Makhzum
Hilal	Al-Mughira
Abd al-Asad	Hisham (d. 598)	Abu Rabi'a	Al-Walid (d. 622)	Fakih	Abu Umayya
Abu Salama	Amr (Abu Jahl) (d. 624)	Al-Harith (d. 639)	Ayyash (d. 636)	Al-Walid (d. 620s)	Khalid (d. 642)	Al-Muhajir (fl. 630–633	Umm Salama (d. 680s)	Muhammad (Islamic prophet)
Umar	Ikrima (d. 634 or 636)	Abd al-Rahman	Abd Allah	Hisham	Abd al-Rahman (d. 666)	Muhajir (d. 657)
Zaynab	Marwan I (Umayyad caliph, 684–685)	Salama	Isma'il	Khalid (fl. 669)	Khalid
Umar (Umayyad prince)	Ayyub	Hisham (fl. 691–706)
Isma'il (fl. 763	Ibrahim (d. 743)	Muhammad (d. 743)	Khalid (d. 744)	A'isha	Abd al-Malik (Umayyad caliph, 685–705)
Khalid (fl. 763)	Hisham (Umayyad caliph, 724–743)

== Notable members ==
- Fatima bint Amr, paternal grandmother of Muhammad
- Amr ibn Hisham, better known as "Abu Jahl"
- Walid ibn al-Mughira
- Umm Salama, a wife of Muhammad
- Khalid ibn al-Walid, a companion of Muhammad
- Mughira ibn Abd-Allah
- Hisham ibn al-Mughirah
- Al-Harith ibn Hisham
- Ibn Zaydún, Arab poet of Córdoba and Seville
- Ikrima ibn Amr
- Al-Muhajir ibn Abi Umayya
- Ibn al-Nafis, polymath, physician, and discoverer of the pulmonary circulation

== See also ==
- Tribes of Arabia

== Bibliography ==
- Akram, A. I. (2004). The Sword of Allah: Khalid bin al-Waleed – His Life and Campaigns (third ed.). ISBN 0-19-597714-9.
- Hinds, M. (1991). "Makhzum". In Bosworth, C. E.; van Donzel, E. & Pellat, Ch. (eds.). The Encyclopaedia of Islam, Second Edition. Volume VI: Mahk–Mid. Leiden: E. J. Brill. pp. 137–140. ISBN 978-90-04-08112-3.
