= Al-Muhajir ibn Abi Umayya =

Companion of Muhammad and Muslim commander

Al-Muhajir ibn Abi Umayya ibn al-Mughira ibn Abd Allah (Arabic: المهاجر بن أبي أمية المغيرة بن عبد الله, romanized: Al-Muhājir ibn Abī Umayya ibn al-Mughīra ibn ʿAbd Allāh) was a companion of the Islamic prophet Muhammad from the Banu Makhzum clan and a Muslim commander active in Yemen during the Ridda wars (632–633).

== Life ==
Al-Muhajir's birth name was al-Walid until it was changed to al-Muhajir (the Emigrant) by Muhammad; the latter noted that one of the Pharaohs bore the name al-Walid and that the name was used so excessively by the Banu Makhzum clan of the Quraysh tribe to which al-Muhajir belonged that it practically became a deity of the clan.

Al-Muhajir's father was Abu Umayya Suhayl, a son of al-Mughira ibn Abd Allah, a prominent pre-Islamic leader of the Makhzum in Mecca. Abu Umayya was well known for his generosity to traveling companions on the road and was popularly known as Zad al-Rakb (Provider for the Passengers). Al-Muhajir's mother was Atika bint Amir from the Firas clan of the Kinana tribe, which was noted for its martial prowess. Al-Muhajir's sister was Umm Salama, one of the wives of Muhammad. He was a paternal first cousin of Khalid ibn al-Walid.

Muhammad appointed al-Muhajir as the tax collector over the Yemenite tribes of Kinda (specifically its Banu Mu'awiya branch) and Sadif. He married Asma bint al-Nu'man ibn Abi al-Jawn, a Kindite noblewoman and former wife of Muhammad; she later married al-Muhajir's Makhzumite kinsman Ikrima ibn Abi Jahl. In 631 Muhammad appointed al-Muhajir governor of Yemen's principal city Sana'a. He did not take up the post, remaining in Medina until the accession of Caliph Abu Bakr in 632.

Abu Bakr dispatched al-Muhajir to reinforce the governor of Yemen, Ziyad ibn Labid al-Ansari, and suppress the rebellion of the Banu Mu'awiya clan of Kinda in Hadhramawt (south Arabian coastal region) during the Ridda wars. The Kinda was ultimately surrendered to al-Muhajir and Ikrima.

== Bibliography ==
- Donner, Fred M., ed. (1993). The History of al-Ṭabarī, Volume X: The Conquest of Arabia, A.D. 632–633/A.H. 11. SUNY Series in Near Eastern Studies. Albany, New York: State University of New York Press. ISBN 978-0-7914-1071-4.
- Donner, Fred M. (1981). The Early Islamic Conquests. Princeton: Princeton University Press. ISBN 0-691-05327-8.
- Blankinship, Khalid Yahya, ed. (1993). The History of al-Ṭabarī, Volume XI: The Challenge to the Empires. SUNY Series in Near Eastern Studies. Albany, New York: State University of New York Press. ISBN 978-0-7914-0851-3.
- Hinds, M. (1991). "Makhzūm". In Bosworth, C. E.; van Donzel, E. & Pellat, Ch. (eds.). The Encyclopaedia of Islam, Second Edition. Volume VI: Mahk–Mid. Leiden: E. J. Brill. pp. 137–140. ISBN 978-90-04-08112-3.
- Kister, M. J. (1975). ""Call Yourselves by Graceful Names ...". Lectures in Memory of Professor Martin M. Plessner. Jerusalem: Institute of Asian and African Studies, The Hebrew University. pp. 3–25.
- Landau-Tasseron, Ella, ed. (1998). The History of al-Ṭabarī, Volume XXXIX: Biographies of the Prophet's Companions and their Successors: al-Ṭabarī's Supplement to his History. SUNY Series in Near Eastern Studies. Albany, New York: State University of New York Press. ISBN 978-0-7914-2819-1.
- Lecker, M. (2004). "Al-Ridda". In Bearman, P. J.; Bianquis, Th.; Bosworth, C. E.; van Donzel, E. & Heinrichs, W. P. (eds.). The Encyclopaedia of Islam, Second Edition. Volume XII: Supplement. Leiden: E. J. Brill. pp. 692–695. ISBN 978-90-04-13974-9.
- Lecker, Michael (November 1994). "Kinda on the Eve of Islam and during the "Ridda"". Journal of the Royal Asiatic Society. 4 (3): 333–356. doi:10.1017/S1356186300005964. JSTOR 25182938.
