= Muawwaz ibn Amr =

Companion of Muhammad

Mowaz ibn Amr was a companion of Muhammad. He and his brother, Muaaz ibn Amr, wounded Abu Jahl in the Battle of Badr.

He was the son of Amr ibn al-Jamuh but converted to Islam, at first secretly. Before the hijra, Muhammad had appointed Mus'ab ibn Umayr to carry out dawah (inviting others to join Islam), which he did excellently. Stirrings of change did not leave even the household of Amr ibn al-Jamuh. All of his three sons, Mowaz ibn Amr, Muaaz ibn Amr and Khallad ibn Amr, entered the fold of Islam. On their initiation, even their mother, Hind bint Amr, professed the shahadah.

== See also ==
- Sahaba
- List of expeditions of Muhammad
