= Second and third deputation with Abu Talib =

This is a sub-article to Muhammad before Medina.

Following the failed attempt from the Meccan polytheists to have those Muslims who were part of the second migration to Abyssinia expelled and handed back to their persecutors, the Meccans tried to negotiated with Muhammad's protector and uncle Abu Talib ibn ‘Abd al-Muttalib, who was still in Mecca with his nephew to have Muhammad ostracized, a significant demand from the Meccans considering that social death would often result in death or slavery in the Pre-Islamic Arabian culture (Arabic: Jahiliyyah).

Historical sources do not give the exact date of these two meetings with Abu Talib. They seem, however more likely to have taken place in 7 BH (614–615 CE) with a brief lapse of time in between.

== Second deputation ==
Abu Talib ibn ‘Abd al-Muttalib held significant power in Mecca as the head of the Banu Hashim, and this protection made it impossible to have Muhammad silenced or subjected to the kind of torture meted out against the Muslims without protection. The polytheist Meccan leaders approached Abu Talib again and insisted he put a stop to his nephew, Muhammad's preaching of monotheism (Arabic: tawhid), warning that otherwise he would be faced with severe hostility.

Their enmity and open threats of a breach between Abu Talib's clan, the Banu Hashim and the rest of the Banu Quraish distressed Abu Talib who was aware of the cost that his nephew Muhammad had to pay if deserted. Abu Talib sent for Muhammad and told him the news, "Spare me and yourself and put not burden on me that I can't bear". Muhammad thought that his uncle would let him down and would no longer support him, so he replied: "O my uncle! By God if they put the sun in my right hand and the moon in my left on condition that I abandon this course, until God has made me victorious, or I perish therein, I would not abandon it." Muhammad got up, and as he turned away, his uncle called back and then said "Go and preach what you please, for by God I will never forsake you.". Abu Talib then recited two lines of verse with meanings of full support to Muhammad.

== Third deputation ==
Realizing that Muhammad would not relent and that Abu Talib was not to forsake his nephew even when his clan was threatened, they tried and arranged for a third deputation. They brought Ammarah ibn Walid (Arabic: عمارة بن وليد), the son of the powerful and rich war-clan leader Walid ibn al-Mughira and brother of the undefeated general Khalid ibn al-Walid and said:

"O Abu Talib! we have brought you a smart boy still in the bloom of his youth, to make use of his mind and strength and take him as your son in exchange for your nephew, who has run counter to your religion, brought about social discord, found fault with your way of life, so that we kill him and rid you of his endless troubles; just man for man."

Abu Talib replied:

"It is really an unfair bargain. You give me your son to bring him up and I give you my son to kill him! By God, it is something incredible!!"

Mut`im ibn `Uday, a member of the delegation, interrupted saying that Quraish had been fair in that bargain because:

"they meant only to rid you of that source of hateful trouble, but as I see you are determined to refuse their favors."

Abu Talib turned down all their offers and challenged them to do whatever they pleased.

Another account quotes:

Quraish said:

Your nephew has insulted our gods, called our great men as insane and reckoned our fathers to be deviated ones. Therefore, you surrender him to us or else, there shall occur a war between us.

Abu Talib replied:

May your mouths be shut forever. I swear by Allah that I shall never surrender him to you.

They said:

Emara-ibn-Walid-ibn-Mughaira is the most handsome and noble young man among the Quraish. You may keep him as your son instead of Muhammad and surrender Muhammad to us so that we can kill him. Let us exchange our man with your man.

Abu Talib replied:

Woe be upon you people. May Allah turn your face dark and gloomy. I swear by Allah that you have indeed spoken the evil. Do you mean that I should hand over my son to you so that you can kill him and will give me your son in exchange so that I take care of him! I swear by Allah that if I do so, I would be but an evil man.

Thereafter he said:

I would like you to separate the baby-camels from their mother. If the mother camel gets attracted towards the other baby-camels (and not her own ones) then, I shall hand over Muhammad to you.

He then recited a poem.

This is included in the Sirah Rasul Allah of Ibn Hisham.
