= Najiyah bint al-Walid =

Companion of the Islamic prophet Muhammad

Najiyah bint al-Walid ibn al-Mughira (Arabic: ناجية بنت الوليد بن المغيرة, romanized: Nājiyah bint al-Walīd ibn al-Mughīra) is a sahaba of Muhammad. She is the daughter of Walid ibn al-Mughira.

Najiyah was one of women who became Muslim before their husbands did. Some of these women were prevented from doing the hijra while their husbands were still non-Muslims.

== See also ==
- Sahaba
