= Al-Walid ibn al-Walid =

Companion of Muhammad

Al-Walid ibn al-Walid ibn al-Mughira (Arabic: الوليد بن الوليد بن المغيرة, romanized: al-Walīd b. al-Walīd b. al-Mughīra) was an early companion of the Islamic prophet Muhammad. Al-Walid belonged to the Banu Makhzum clan of the Quraysh tribe of Mecca and was a brother of the prominent Muslim commander Khalid ibn al-Walid. He fought with the Quraysh against Muhammad at the Battle of Badr in 624, during which many of his clansmen were slain. He was captured by the Muslims during the battle, but was released and embraced Islam. Upon his return to Mecca, he was shackled and imprisoned. According to the history of al-Tabari (d. 923), al-Walid and his Makhzumite kinsmen Salama ibn Hisham (a brother of Abu Jahl) and Ayyash ibn Abi Rabi'a emigrated from Mecca to join Muhammad and his followers in Medina, where he later died of heart failure. He was mourned by Muhammad's Makhzumite wife Umm Salama, who recited:

For al-Walīd b. al-Walīd b. al-Mughīrah, O my eye, let your tears flow,
The likes of al-Walīd b. al-Walīd Abū al-Walīd protect the clan [against its foe].

Al-Walid's eldest son was also called al-Walid. Muhammad, considering the Makhzum's usage of this name to be excessive, changed the younger al-Walid's name to Abd Allah. Abd Allah's descendants became a prominent family in Medina and inherited the properties of Khalid ibn al-Walid after the deaths of his last descendants in c. 750 because they were the closest blood relatives of the prominent commander, and continued to be in possession of the properties at least through the late 9th century.

== Bibliography ==
- Elad, Amikam (2016). The Rebellion of Muḥammad al-Nafs al-Zakiyya in 145/762: Ṭālibīs and Early ʿAbbāsīs in Conflict. Leiden: Brill. ISBN 978-90-04-22989-1.
- Hinds, M. (1991). "Makhzūm". In Bosworth, C. E.; van Donzel, E. & Pellat, Ch. (eds.). The Encyclopaedia of Islam, Second Edition. Volume VI: Mahk–Mid. Leiden: E. J. Brill. pp. 137–140. ISBN 978-90-04-08112-3.
- Kister, M. J. (1975). ""Call Yourselves by Graceful Names ...". Lectures in Memory of Professor Martin M. Plessner. Jerusalem: Institute of Asian and African Studies, The Hebrew University. pp. 3–25.
- Kister, M. J. (1981). "O God, Tighten Thy Grip on Mudar...: Some Socio-Economic and Religious Aspects of an Early Hadith". Journal of the Economic and Social History of the Orient. 24 (3): 242–273.
- Landau-Tasseron, Ella, ed. (1998). The History of al-Ṭabarī, Volume XXXIX: Biographies of the Prophet's Companions and their Successors: al-Ṭabarī's Supplement to his History. SUNY Series in Near Eastern Studies. Albany, New York: State University of New York Press. ISBN 978-0-7914-2819-1.
