= Walid ibn al-Mughira =

Chief of the Quraysh in Mecca (570–622)

Al-Walid ibn al-Mughira
- Abu Abd Shams

Chief of Banu Makhzum
- Rule: 570 – 622
- Predecessor: Mughira ibn Abd Allah
- Successor: Amr ibn Hisham
- Born: 550; Mecca, Hejaz, Arabia
- Died: 622; Mecca, Hejaz, Arabia

Al-Walid ibn al-Mughira al-Makhzumi (Arabic: الوليد بن المغيرة المخزومي, romanized: al-Walīd ibn al-Mughīra al-Makhzūmī; 550 – 622 AD) was the chief of the Banu Makhzum clan of the Quraysh tribe.

== Family ==
He was the son of al-Mughīra ibn ʿAbd Allāh ibn ʿUmar ibn Makhzūm.

=== Sons ===
1. Khālid ibn al-Walīd. His mother was Walid's wife, Lubāba as-Sughrá, that is, al-Asmā bint al-Ḥārith ibn al-Ḥazn. However, neither Khalid nor his brothers had as yet converted to Islam at the time of their father's death.
2. Hishām ibn al-Walīd.
3. Walīd ibn al-Walīd.
4. Ammara ibn Walid or ʿUmāra

Sources mention an Umar ibn Walid ibn Mughīra, but it is unclear whether he was the son of Walīd.

=== Daughters ===
1. Najiya bint al-Walid ibn al-Mughira who was married to Safwan ibn Umayya
2. Fāṭima bint al-Walīd who was married to Ḥārith ibn Hishām ibn al-Mughīrah of Banu Makhzum clan. Fatima was the mother of Umm Ḥakīm who was married to ʿIkrima ibn Abi Jahl followed by Khālid ibn Saʿīd.

== Attitude to Islam ==
When the Quraysh leaders saw that the Islamic prophet Muhammad refused to withdraw from his mission and continued preaching of monotheism under the protection of Abū Ṭālib, Walīd ibn al-Mughīra, along with ʿUtba ibn Rabīʿa, Shayba ibn Rabīʿa, Abu Sufyān ibn Ḥarb, Abu al-Bakhtarī (al-ʿĀṣ) ibn Hishām, al-Aswad ibn al-Muṭṭalib, ʿAmr ibn Hishām (Abu Jahl), Nubayh ibn al-Ḥajjāj, Munabbih ibn al-Ḥajjāj and al-ʿĀṣ ibn Wāʾil, went up to Abū Ṭālib ibn Abd al-Muttalib and urged him to convince Muḥammad, his nephew, to stop insulting their gods. They offered him in exchange to be their King and marry as many beautiful women he liked, as long as he would abandon his mission of preaching Islam. To this, Muhammad answered, “By Allah, if they put the sun in my right hand and the moon in my left, I would not abandon it.

After realizing that Abū Ṭālib would not give up on Muḥammad on any account, the Quraysh leaders went to Abū Ṭālib with Walīd's son ʿUmāra, and said, "O Abū Ṭālib, this is ʿUmāra, the strongest and most handsome young man among Quraysh, so take him. You will have the benefit of his intelligence and support. Adopt him as a son and give up to us this nephew of yours who has opposed your religion and the religion of your fathers, severed the unity of your people, and mocked our way of life, so that we may kill him. This will be man for man." But Abu Talib refused this offer.

When Muhammad recited Quran 53, it has been reported in a hadith text Muslims and polytheists prostrated together in a communal act of worship. According to Alfred Guillaume Walīd ibn al-Mughīra was too old to prostrate, instead, he took a symbolic handful of dirt and bent over it. However a hadith in Sahih al-Bukhari reported that it was actually Umaiya bin Khalaf who took a hand full of dust in his hand and prostrated on it when An-Najm was recited.

In 619 Walīd provided protection to the Muslim ʿUthmān ibn Maẓʿūn. When ʿUthmān saw the misery in which the apostle's companions were living while he lived night and day under al-Walīd's protection, he said, "It is more than I can bear that I should be perfectly safe under the protection of a polytheist while my friends are afflicted for God's sake." So he went to Walīd and renounced his protection. Walīd asked him to renounce his protection publicly as he had given it publicly. So ʿUthmān said in public, "I have found him loyal and honorable in his protection, but I don't want to ask anyone but Allah for protection; so I give him back his promise!"

== Verses of the Quran about Walid ==
Walīd ibn al-Mughīra was one of the Quraysh leaders who were indirectly mentioned in several verses of Quran. He was one of the five principal offenders of Muhammad, the others being al-Aswad ibn al-Muṭṭalib ibn Asad, al-Aswad ibn ʿAbdu Yaghūth, al-ʿĀṣ ibn Wāʾil ibn Hishām and al-Ḥārith ibn al-Ṭulāṭila (from Banu Khuzāʿa).

=== The Pilgrimage (Hajj) ===
Walid was a personage of great influence among the Quraysh. After he heard Muhammad reciting, Walid went to Quraysh and said: "I have just heard Muhammad's words, which for sure are neither a human's nor a jinn's. They are euphonious and relaxing, like a tree full of reachable fruits. They are of the highest quality and cannot be out-perfected." He told them, "The time of the annual pilgrimage has come round again, and representatives of Arabs will come to you and they will have heard about Muhammad. So agree upon one opinion without dispute, so that none of us will give the lie to the other." He recommended that they call Muhammad a sorcerer who has brought a message by which he separated a man from his father, brother, wife or family. The Quraysh accordingly warned the people attending the fair about Muhammad's doing. So, according to a Muslim historian, "Allah revealed verses 11–25 in Sura 74 concerning al-Walid."

=== Discussion of Hell ===
One day Muhammad was sitting with Walid in the Kaaba when Nadr ibn al-Harith came and sat with among the assembly of the Quraysh. When Muhammad spoke, al-Naḍr interrupted him. Muhammad responded until he silenced him. Then he read to them all:

"Verily ye and what ye serve other than Allah is the fuel of Hell. You will come to it. If these had been gods they would not have come to it, but all will be in it everlastingly. There is wailing and there they will not hear." (Sura 21: 98–100)

After Muhammad had left, ʿAbdullah ibn al-Zibaʿrā al-Sahmī arrived. Walid said to him, "By Allah, al-Naḍr could not stand up to Muhammad just now, and he alleged that we and our gods are fuel for Hell." ʿAbdullah replied, "If I had found him, I would have refuted him. Ask Muhammad, "Is everything that is worshipped besides God in Gehenna with those who worship it?" We worship the angels; the Jews worship ʿUzayr; and the Christians worship Jesus Son of Mary." Walid and those with him in the assembly marveled at ʿAbdullah's words and thought that he had argued convincingly. When Muhammad was told of this he said: "Everyone who wishes to be worshipped to the exclusion of God will be with those who worship him. They worship only satans and those they have ordered to be worshipped." Then this verse of the Quraan was revealed:

"Those who have received kindness from us in the past will be removed far from it and will not hear its sound and they abide eternally in their heart's desire." (Sura 21:101–102)

=== Discussion of Worldly Prestige ===
"They say: “Why was this Qur'an not sent down upon some great man from the two (main) cities?'" (Sura 43: 31) It is considered that Qureish thought one of such men to be Walid ibn Al Mughira

=== The Suggestion to Combine Religions ===
One day as Muhammad was going round the Kaaba, Walīd approached him along with al-Aswad ibn al-Muṭṭalib ibn Asad ibn ʿAbd al-ʿUzzā, Umayya ibn Khalaf and al-ʿĀṣ ibn Wāʾil to offer him a proposition. They said: "Muhammad, let us worship what you worship and you worship what we worship. If what you worship is better than what we worship we will take a share of it, and if what we worship is better than what you worship, you can take a share of that." The response to this proposition was:

"Say, O disbelievers, I do not worship what you worship, and you do not worship what I worship, and I do not worship what you worship, and you do not worship what I worship; You have your code of life (Deen) and I have mine.” (Sura 109)

=== Mockery ===
One day Muhammad passed by Walīd, Umayyah ibn Khalaf and Abu Jahl ibn Hisham. They reviled and mocked him, which caused him distress. The Quraan addressed this situation:

"Apostles have been mocked before thee, but that which they mocked at hemmed them in." (Sura 6: 10)

When Walid and his friends persisted in constant mockery of Muhammad, this verse was recited:

"Proclaim what you have been ordered and turn away from the polytheists. We will surely protect you against the mockers who put another god beside Allah. In the end they will know." (Sura 15: 94)

According to a Muslim tradition, the five mockers suffered divine vengeance.

The same Yazid told me from Urwa (or it may have been from some other traditionist) that Gabriel came to the apostle when the mockers were going round the temple. He stood up and the apostle stood at his side; and as Al-Aaswad ibn Al-Muttalib passed, Gabriel threw a green leaf in his face and he became blind. Then Al-Aaswad ibn Abdu Yaghuth passed, and he pointed at his belly, which swelled so that he died of dropsy. Next Al-Walid passed by. He pointed at an old scar on the bottom of his ankle (the result of a wound he received some years earlier as he was trailing his gown when he passed by a Khuzaʿi who was feathering an arrow, and the arrowhead caught in his wrapper and scratched his foot – a mere nothing). But the wound opened again and he died of it. Al-Aas passed. He pointed to his instep, and he went off on his ass making for Al-Taïf. He tied the animal to a thorny tree and a thorn entered his foot and he died of it. Lastly Al-Harith passed. He pointed at his head. It immediately filled with pus and killed him.

== Death ==
He died in the year 1 AH (622–623).

== See also ==
- Mughira (name)
- Waleed (name)
- Non-Muslims who interacted with Muslims during Muhammad's era
- List of battles of Muhammad

== Sources ==
- Guillaume, Alferd (1955). The Life Of Muhammad : A translation of Ishaq's Sirat Rasul Allah. Oxford University Press. ISBN 0-19-636033-1.
- Watt, W. Montgomery (1953). Muhammad at Mecca. Oxford University Press. ISBN 978-0-19-577277-7.
- Zettersteen, K. V. (2002). "Al-Walīd b. al-Mug̲h̲īra". In Bearman, P. J.; Bianquis, Th.; Bosworth, C. E.; van Donzel, E. & Heinrichs, W. P. (eds.). The Encyclopaedia of Islam, Second Edition. Volume XI: W–Z. Leiden: E. J. Brill. p. 129. ISBN 978-90-04-12756-2.
