= Umm Salama =

Muhammad's sixth wife (c. 580/596 – 680/683)

Mother of the Believers Umm Salama
- أم سلمة
- Born: Hind bint Abi Umayya c. 580 or 596 CE; Mecca, Hejaz, Arabia (present-day Saudi Arabia)
- Died: Dhu al-Qadah 62 AH; c. 680 or 682/683 CE; Medina, Hejaz, Umayyad caliphate (present-day Saudi Arabia)
- Resting place: Jannat al-Baqi, Medina
- Known for: Sixth wife of Muhammad
- Spouses: Abu Salama 'Abd Allah ibn 'Abd al-Asad (died. 624 CE Jumada al-Thani 2 AH); Muhammad (m. 625; died. 632)
- Children: Salama; Umar; Zaynab; Ruqayyah; (all with Abu Salama)
- Parent(s): Abu Umayya ibn Al-Mughira (father); Atikah bint ʿAmir ibn Rabi'ah (mother)
- Relatives: Al-Muajir (full brother); Qurayba (paternal sister); Khalid (paternal first cousin)
- Family: Banu Makhzum (by birth); Ahl al-Bayt (by marriage)

Hind bint Abi Umayya (Arabic: هِنْد ابِنْت أَبِي أُمَيَّة, Hind ʾibnat ʾAbī ʾUmayya, c. 580 or 596 – 680 or 683), better known as Umm Salama (Arabic: أُمّ سَلَمَة) or Hind al-Makhzūmiyya (Arabic: هِنْد ٱلْمَخْزُومِيَّة) was the sixth wife of Muhammad.

"Umm Salama" was her kunya meaning, "mother of Salama". She was one of the most influential female companions of Muhammad. She is recognized largely for recalling numerous Hadiths, or sayings and narrations attributed to Muhammad. Twelver Shia Muslims believe that Umm Salama was Muhammad's most important wife after Khadija.

== Before marriage with Muhammad ==
Umm Salama's birth name was Hind. Her father was Abu Umayya ibn Al-Mughira ibn Abdullah ibn Umar ibn Makhzum ibn Yaqazah also known as Suhayl or Zad ar-Rakib. He was an elite member of the Quraysh tribe, known for his great generosity, especially to travelers. Her mother was 'Ātikah bint 'Āmir ibn Rabī'ah, of the Firas ibn Ghanam branch of the Kinana.

=== Marriage to Abu Salama ===
Before her marriage to Muhammad, Umm Salama was married to Abu Salama Abd Allah ibn Abd al-Asad, whose mother was Barrah bint Abdul Muttalib. Abu Salama was Muhammad's foster brother and one of his close companions. Umm Salama bore with Abu Salama four children: Salama, Umar, Zaynab and Ruqayyah.

=== Conversion to Islam ===
Umm Salama and her husband Abu Salama were among the first who converted to Islam. Only Ali and a few others were Muslims before them. Despite intense anger and persecution from the powerful Quraysh in response to their conversion to Islam, Umm Salama and Abu Salama continued their devotion to Islam.

As the persecution grew in severity, the new Muslims began to look for life away from Mecca. Muhammad instructed his newly converted followers, including Umm Salama and Abu Salama, to make a migration to Abyssinia. Umm Salama abandoned her honorable life in her clan in Mecca to migrate. While in Abyssinia, these Muslims were told that there had been a decrease in persecution along with an increase in numbers of Muslims in Mecca. This information caused Umm Salama, her husband, and the rest of the Muslim emigrants to travel back to Mecca. Upon their return to Mecca, the Quraysh again began viciously persecuting the Muslims. In response, Muhammad gave his followers instructions to make a migration to Medina, also known as the hijrah. Umm Salama, along with her husband and son planned to make the hijra together, however this was stopped when Umm Salama's clan forced her to stay in Mecca, while Abu Salama's clan took the child.

Umm Salama recounted this story:

Before we were out of Makkah, however, some men from my clan stopped us and said to my husband: 'Though you are free to do what you like with yourself, you have no power over your wife. She is our daughter. Do you expect us to allow you to take her away from us?' Then they pounced on him and snatched me away from him. My husband's clan, Banu 'Abd al-Asad, saw them taking me and became hot with rage. 'No! By Allah' they shouted, 'we shall not abandon the boy. He is our son and we have a first claim over him.' They took him by the hand and pulled him away from me.

— Umm Salama

Abu Salama made the trip to Medina alone, leaving his wife and child in Mecca. After some time, Umm Salama was permitted by the Quraysh to leave Mecca, and was given her son back by her husband's tribe. With her son, she completed the hijra and was reconnected with her husband.

=== Death of Abu Salama ===
During her marriage to Abu Salamah, Umm Salamah (in a story related by Ziyad ibn Abi Maryam) is said to have asked her husband to make agreement that when either of them died, the other would not remarry. However, in this tradition, Abu Salamah responded by instructing Umm Salamah to remarry after his death. He then prayed, "O God, provide Umm Salamah after me with a better man than me who will not grieve her or injure her!"

During the Battle of Uhud (March 625), Abu Salamah was severely injured. While Abu Salamah was dying due to these wounds, he recalled a story to Umm Salamah involving a message he had heard from Muhammad: "I heard the Messenger of God saying, 'Whenever a calamity afflicts anyone he should say, "Surely from God we are and to Him we shall certainly return."' And he would pray, 'O Lord, give me in return something better from it which only You, Exalted and Mighty can give'". This traditional story has been transmitted with various differences, but the fundamental principles of the hadith remain intact.

Her husband eventually died from the wounds he received in the Battle of Uhud. Umm Salamah remembered the hadith recalled by her husband prior to his death, and began reciting the given prayer.

Following Abdullah ibn Abdulasad's death in the battle of Uhud she became known as Ayyin al-Arab - "the one who had lost her husband". She had no family in Medina except her small children, but she was given support by both the Muhajirun and Ansar. After finishing the iddah of four months and ten days, the prescribed period that a woman must wait after the death of her husband before she can remarry, Umm Salama got offers of marriage. Abu Bakr and then Umar asked to marry her, but she declined. Muhammad himself then proposed to Umm Salama. She initially hesitated, stating, "O Messenger of Allah, I have three characteristics. I am a woman who is extremely jealous and I am afraid that you will see in me something that will anger you and cause Allah to punish me. I am a woman who is already advanced in age and I am a woman who has a young family."

However, Muhammad appeased each of her concerns, "Regarding the jealousy you mentioned, I pray to Allah the Almighty to let it go away from you. Regarding the question of age you have mentioned, I am afflicted with the same problem as you. Regarding the dependent family you have mentioned, your family is my family."

== Marriage to Muhammad ==
Umm Salama was married to Muhammad at the age of 29 Umm Salamah was a widow with 3 children and a fourth born almost immediately after their marriage.

When Fatimah bint Asad (mother of the 4th Caliph Ali) died, Muhammad is said to have chosen Umm Salama as the guardian of Fatimah bint Muhammad. However, the latter Fatimah is thought to have married Ali in 1 AH or 2 AH, Fatimah bint Asad died in 4 AH, and Umm Salama married Muhammad in year 5, so any guardianship must have been purely nominal.

The verse of purification (33:33) in the Qur'an was revealed to Muhammad in her house.

=== Umm Salama and the wives of Muhammad ===
In the fourth year following the migration to Medina (4 AH), Umm Salama accepted a marriage proposal from Muhammad . After sharing her three reservations about the marriage, and hearing the response from Muhammad, Umm Salama was so pleased that she accepted the proposal. Umm Salama became the eldest of all of Muhammad's wives. She became the second highest-ranking wife of Muhammad along Aisha, only behind Khadija. Her elevated status among the rest of the wives was a result of her presence in many wars and her defense of the household of Muhammad. Attributes that distinguish Umm Salama from the rest of the wives of Muhammad include the following: Her role in Fatimah's upbringing (who Umm Salama proclaimed displayed more knowledge than ever herself in all affairs), her political activism, her accounts of Muhammad's narrations, and her unwavering defense of Ali's personality and leadership following Muhammad's death.

The greatest attribute of the wives of Muhammad is demonstrated as being known as the "Mothers of the believers". They were also prohibited from marrying another man ever again. (33:53) The Qur'an indicates that the wives of Muhammad had to be role models in society (33:30-32). She was often looked up to by the rest of the wives of Muhammad due to her intelligence and political knowledge. Umm Salama herself narrated 378 Hadith, among them being some of the most important. She was the last of the wives of Muhammad to pass away.

=== Impact on Muhammad and society ===
Because of her beauty, knowledge, and wisdom, Umm Salama held a prominent role in the house of Muhammad and society. She was an exceptional wife of Muhammad in her faith and morals. As a woman, she carried out and completed all of her religious duties. During her marriage to Muhammad, she strived to keep him happy. She always held the utmost respect for him. She was known in society for her intelligence, political savvy, and activity in fighting for women's rights. Umm Salama was a woman most gifted in judgment. She was active in the movement for women's rights in early Islamic society too. She once asked Muhammad a very political question, "Why are men mentioned in the Quran and why are we not?" In a response from heaven to Muhammad, Allah declares that the two sexes are of total equality as members of the community and believers. It doesn't matter the sex, as long as the person is faithful and has the desire to obey Allah, they will earn his grace. This act by Umm Salama sets the precedent, and shows that women could go directly to Muhammad when unsatisfied with a gender role associated with them in society. This action by Umm Salama represented a veritable protest movement by the women. Umm Salama possessed very good judgment, rapid powers of reasoning, and unparalleled ability to formulate correct opinions.

=== Treaty of Hudaybiyya ===
Umm Salama acted as Muhammad's advisor during negotiations concerning the Treaty of Hudaybiyyah with the Meccans in 628 CE (6 AH) One of the main objects of this treaty was to determine the relations between Muhammad and the Muslims of Medina with the Quraysh in Mecca. The treaty was aimed at achieving peace between the two groups and allowing the Muslims to complete their annual pilgrimage to the Kaaba, known as Hajj, which they did the following year in 629 (7 AH). This treaty was essential since it established a 10-year peace deal between the two groups. The treaty was broken later in 629 (8 AH) which led to the conquest of Mecca.

== After Muhammad ==
After Muhammad's death, Umm Salama continued to have an influence on Islam. Her numerous Hadith transmissions have had a lasting impact on the future of the religion. Umm Salama, along with one of Muhammad's other wives, Aisha, also took roles as imams, leading other women in worship.

Umm Salama also took a strong position in the Battle of the Camel, in which the factions of Aisha and Ali were in direct opposition. Umm Salama openly disagreed with the involvement of Aisha in the battle. She strongly supported the faction of Ali, and is said to have recalled stories in which Muhammad favors Ali and Fatimah to back up her opinions on the battle.

Umm Salama even sent her son, Umar, to fight for Ali's victory.

Umm Salama died around 64 AH. Although the date of her death is disputed, her son said that Umm Salama died at the age of 84. She was buried in the Baqi Cemetery. She was the last surviving of Muhammad's wives.

== Hadith ==
Umm Salama and Aisha provided more Hadiths than any of the other wives of Muhammad. For Umm Salama, 378 narrations have been reported through the Sunni Muslims. Among the [Hadith] she narrated are:

=== Verse of purification 33:33 ===
Settle in your homes, and do not display yourselves as women did in the days of ˹pre-Islamic˺ ignorance. Establish prayer, pay alms-tax, and obey Allah and His Messenger. Allah only intends to keep ˹the causes of˺ evil away from you and purify you completely, O members of the ˹Prophet’s˺ family!

The verse of purification (Ayat al-Tathir) is given its name due to the mentioning of purity in the last line. According to Umm Salama, the verse of purification was revealed in her home when only Muhammad, Ali, Fatimah, Hasan, and Husayn were present. Scholars such as Tarbasi and Tha'labi have described Umm Salama narrating: "One day Lady Fatima having cooked some food brought it to my house for the Prophet. The Prophet said, 'O the light of my eyes, call Ali and your sons so that we may eat this food together.'" When all had gathered and they had eaten from that food, Angel Jibra'eel descended and revealed the following verse: Indeed God desires to repel all impurity from you, O People of the Household, and purify you with a thorough purification.

Upon hearing the verse, the Prophet laid out a cloak over them and said: "O God, these are the people of my household. They are my confidants and my supporters. O God, remove impurity from them and keep them thoroughly pure." Umm Salama relates, "As I heard this prayer from the Prophet, I said: 'O Messenger of God! Am I also with you?' To which he replied: 'You do not have the level of my Ahlul Bayt, but you are a lady of noble traits.'

Some exegesis, including Amina Wadud interpret the first line, "stay quietly in your houses, and make not a dazzling display, like that of the former Times of Ignorance" not to imply women shouldn't be allowed to go out at all, but rather to stress the limitation of going out for the aim of wanton display.

=== 33:35 ===
This verse from the Quran lists ten categories of people who are promised forgiveness and a religious reward. The text applies these qualities equally to both men and women. These include those who identify as Muslims and believers, as well as those who are devout, truthful, and patient, who are humble, charitable, and who participate in fasting. It also mentions those who maintain sexual modesty and control chastity and those who regularly engage in the remembrance of God. According to Quran, Individuals who meet these criteria are promised forgiveness and a religious reward.

Umm Salama sought out equality and autonomy for Muslim women and never hesitated to posit political questions to Muhammad. This verse initiated when Umm Salama asked Muhammad, "why are men mentioned in the Koran and why are we not?" She is quoted narrating, "I had asked the Prophet why the Koran did not speak of us as it did of men. And what was my surprise one afternoon, when I was combing my hair, to hear his voice from the minbar. I hastily did up my hair and ran to one of the apartments from where I could hear better" It is there that Umm Salama heard the verse.
