= Mu'adh ibn Amr =

Mua'adh ibn 'Amr (Arabic: معاذ بن عمرو) was a companion of Muhammad. He and his brother, Muawwaz ibn Amr, wounded Abu Jahl in the Battle of Badr.

== Life ==
Before the hijra, Muhammad had appointed Mus'ab ibn Umair to carry out Dawah, which he did.

His father was 'Amr ibn Jamooh, a devotee of the goddess Manāt and member of the Banu Salma branch of the Banu Khazraj tribe of Madina. On their conversion, their mother, Hind bint 'Amr, also did. But they kept their faith secret so it wouldn't hurt their father.

Her husband was unaware of her new religion and one day warned her of the "danger" posed by Mus'ab to the traditional faith of Medina and asked her to safeguard their sons against it. Hind advised him to listen to what their second son Muaaz had to tell them, Muaaz then recited Surah Fatihah. The recitation made an impact on her husband, but he was reluctant to abandon Manāt.

After much prayer, and the repeated theft of the statue by his sons, Amr decided that Manāt was not worthy of worship and also adopted Islam.

Abu Jahl ('Amr ibn Hisham) was killed in the Battle of Badr by two youth, Muaaz ibn 'Amr and Muawwidh ibn Afra'.

== See also ==
- Sahaba
- List of expeditions of Muhammad
