= Hisham ibn al-Mughira =

Quraysh Banu Makhzum clan commander (died 598)

Hisham ibn al-Mughira (died 598) was an Arab tribal leader from the Banu Makhzum clan of the Quraysh tribe. He was a person of high rank among the Quraysh and he was one of the commanders in the Sacrilegious War.

He was the son of al-Mughira ibn Abd Allah, one of the leaders of the Quraysh. One of his daughters was Hantamah, who was the mother of Umar. By his wife Asma bint Mukharraba, he was the father of Amr ibn Hisham the notorious opponent of Islamic prophet Muhammad. His brother was Walid ibn al-Mughira, making him an uncle of the famous Muslim general Khalid ibn al-Walid. Hisham was a contemporary of Muhammad.

It is believed that he died in 598.

== See also ==
- Non-Muslim interactants with Muslims during Muhammad's era
- Sahaba
