= Ayyash ibn Abi Rabi'a =

Companion of Muhammad

ʿAyyāsh ibn Abī Rabīʿa (Arabic: عياش بن أبي ربيعة) was one of the Islamic prophet Muhammad's companions who converted to Islam before the migration to Medina. He was also a half brother of Abu Jahl as they shared the same mother, and his paternal cousin.

== Imprisonment by Abu Jahl ==
Ayyash was one of the immigrants who went to Medina before Muhammad. He migrated with Umar ibn Khattab. Abu Jahl decided to get him back and spread a false story that Ayyash's mother was ill. Abu Jahl went to Medina with his brother Harith and told Ayyash that his mother was ill. Umar warned Ayyash not to go, and gave his own healthy camel to Ayyash to help him escape if needed. On the way to Mecca, Abu Jahl tied Ayyash and took him to Mecca and then imprisoned him.

== Hz.Muhammad's prayer ==
Salama ibn Hisham said that Abu Hurayra said that Prophet Muhammad used to pray, "O' Allah, rescue Ayyash ibn Abi Rabia! O' Allah, rescue Salama ibn Hisham! O' Allah, rescue al-Walid ibn al-Walid! O' Allah, rescue all oppressed believers!" (Sahih Bukhari: 6541)

== See also ==
- Sahabah
- Abu Jahl
