= Al-Mughira ibn Abd Allah =

Chief of Quraysh in Mecca (early 6th-century)

Al-Mughīra ibn ʿAbd Allāh ibn ʿUmar

Chief of the Quraysh
- Rule: Early 6th century – 570
- Predecessor: Abd Allah ibn Umar al-Makhzumi
- Successor: Walid ibn al-Mughira
- Born: later 5th-century Mecca, Hejaz, Arabia
- Died: 570; Mecca, Hejaz, Arabia

Al-Mughīra ibn ʿAbd Allāh ibn ʿUmar (Arabic: المغيرة بن عبد الله بن عمر) was a preeminent leader of the Quraysh tribe's Banu Makhzum clan in Mecca in the 6th century. His descendants, the Banu al-Mughira, became the principle house of the Makhzum for the remainder of the pre-Islamic period and in the centuries following the advent of Islam in the 620s.

== Life and legacy ==
Al-Mughira was the son of Abd Allah ibn Umar and a great-grandson of the eponymous progenitor of the Banu Makhzum clan of the Quraysh tribe of Mecca. He was likely active as a leader of his clan and tribe in the mid-6th century CE, a period in which Mecca, traditionally a pilgrimage center for the polytheistic Arabs during the pre-Islamic period, was becoming a political center as well. Al-Mughira was a contemporary of Abd al-Muttalib of the Quraysh's Banu Hashim clan and the grandfather of the Islamic prophet Muhammad. Anecdotes recorded by the 8th- and 9th-century historians Mus'ab al-Zubayri and al-Baladhuri mention that al-Mughira provoked a rebellion by the nomadic Banu Fazara tribe as a result of disbarring the Fazara's chieftain from making the pilgrimage to Mecca's religious sanctuary, the Ka'aba.

The Makzhum became the Quraysh's strongest and wealthiest clan during the pre-Islamic period as a result of al-Mughira's leadership. Under him or his sons, Mecca was introduced to trade with foreign markets, particularly with South Arabia and Abyssinia. With the exception of the Ka'aba, the Makhzum controlled Mecca. Al-Mughira's family, known as the Banu al-Mughira, became the preeminent household of the Makzhum and for the remainder of the pre-Islamic period and throughout the post-Islamic period most notable members of the Makhzum were descendants of al-Mughira. The families of al-Mughira's at least nineteen brothers and cousins became cadet branches of the clan. Al-Mughira had thirteen or fourteen sons, including Hisham, al-Walid, Abu Umayya, Abu Rabi'a and Hashim. Seven or eight of al-Mughira's grandsons were slain at the Battle of Badr against Muhammad and his followers in 624. Among his descendants who played a prominent role during the early Muslim conquests were Khalid ibn al-Walid, Ikrima ibn Abi Jahl and al-Harith ibn Hisham.

== Bibliography ==
- Hinds, M. (1991). "Makhzūm". In Bosworth, C. E.; van Donzel, E. & Pellat, Ch. (eds.). The Encyclopaedia of Islam, Second Edition. Volume VI: Mahk–Mid. Leiden: E. J. Brill. pp. 137–140. ISBN 978-90-04-08112-3.
- Kister, M. J. (1986). "Mecca and the Tribes of Arabia: Some Notes on their Relations". In Sharon, Moshe (ed.). Studies in Islamic history and Civilization in Honour of Professor David Ayalon. Cana and Leiden: E. J. Brill. pp. 33–57.
- Lammens, Henri (1993) [1927]. "Makhzūm". In Houtsma, M. Th.; Wensinck, A. J.; Levi-Provençal, E.; Gibb, H. A. R.; Heffening, W. (eds.). E.J. Brill's First Encyclopaedia of Islam, 1913-1936, Volume 5 L–Moriscos (Reprint ed.). Leiden, New York and Koln: E. J. Brill. ISBN 90-04-09791-0.
