= Ikrima ibn Amr =

Companion of Muhammad and Muslim commander (probably died in 634 or 636 CE)

- Born: c. 598 (approximate date); Mecca, Hejaz, Arabia
- Died: 636 CE; Ajnadayn or near Yarmuk River
- Spouses: Umm Hakim bint al-Harith; Qutayla bint Qays; Asma bint al-Nu'man
- Children: (possibly a son named Amr)
- Relatives: Abu Jahl (father); Mujaladiya bint Amr (mother)
- Military career
- Allegiance: Quraysh (624–630); Muhammad (630–632); Rashidun Caliphate (632–636)
- Branch: Rashidun army
- Service years: 632–636
- Commands: Field commander of Muslim army in Arabia
- Conflicts: Muslim–Mushrikite wars; Battle of Badr (624); Battle of Uhud (625); Ridda wars; Muslim conquest of Syria; Battle of Ajnadayn (634); Battle of the Yarmuk (636) †

Ikrima ibn Amr ibn Hisham (Arabic: عكرمة بن عمرو بن هشام, romanized: ʿIkrima ibn ʿAmr ibn Hishām; c. 598–636), or known as Ikrima ibn Abi Jahal, was an opponent-turned companion of the Islamic prophet Muhammad and a military commander in the Ridda Wars and the Muslim conquest of Syria. In the latter campaign, he was killed fighting the Byzantine forces.

== Life ==
Ikrima's father was Amr ibn Hisham ibn al-Mughira, a leader of the polytheistic Quraysh tribe's Banu Makhzum clan who was called "Abu Jahl" (father of ignorance) by the Muslims for his stringent opposition to Muhammad. Ikrima's father was slain fighting the Muslims at the Battle of Badr in 624. At the Battle of Uhud, where the Quraysh defeated the Muslims, Ikrima commanded the tribe's left wing; his cousin Khalid ibn al-Walid commanded the right wing. The Makhzum's losses at Badr had diminished their influence and gave way to the Banu Abd Shams under Abu Sufyan to take the helm against Muhammad. However, the influence of Ikrima, by then the preeminent leader of the Makhzum, in Mecca had increased toward the end of the 620s. He opposed the negotiations with Muhammad at al-Hudaybiya and broke the agreement when he and some Quraysh attacked the Banu Khuza'a. When Muhammad conquered Mecca in 630, Ikrima escaped as a fugitive for Yemen where the Makhzum had commercial connections.

Muhammad later pardoned Ikrima, apparently after being petitioned by Ikrima's wife and paternal first cousin Umm Hakim bint al-Harith, who had converted to Islam. According to the historian al-Waqidi, Muhammad appointed Ikrima as a tax collector of the Hawazin tribal confederation in 632. Ikrima was in the Tihama region between Yemen and Mecca when Muhammad died. According to Blankinship, after he embraced Islam, Ikrima devoted to his new religion's cause "much of the energy that had characterized his earlier opposition" to Islam. After Muhammad's death, his close associate Abu Bakr became caliph (leader of the Muslim community) and appointed Ikrima to lead a campaign against rebel Arab tribes in the Ridda wars (632–633), which saw him command expeditions around the entire Arabian Peninsula, with particular focus in Yemen. By 634, Abu Bakr reassigned Ikrima and his troops, who hailed from the Tihama, northern Yemen, Bahrayn and Oman, to reinforce Khalid's army in the Muslim conquest of Syria. Ikrima was most likely martyred fighting the Byzantines in the Battle of Ajnadayn in Palestine in 634, though it is also held that it may have been during the Battle of the Yarmuk in 636.

== Family ==
According to the historian al-Ya'qubi (d. 898), Ikrima was married to Qutayla bint Qays ibn Ma'dikarib, the sister of the chieftain of the Kindite Banu Mu'awiya clan, al-Ash'ath ibn Qays. She was sent from Yemen to marry Muhammad but arrived after he died and afterward was wed to Ikrima. The Islamic tradition mostly agrees that Ikrima died childless, though the 8th-century historian Sayf ibn Umar mentions a son named Amr and Ibn Hazm (d. 1064), possibly deriving his information from Sayf, calls this same son Umar. The modern historian Michael Lecker holds that Ikrima's marriage to Qutayla proved problematic for later Muslim scholars as the remarriage of Muhammad's wives was forbidden. Lecker holds the Islamic tradition censored out the original report used by the traditional Muslim authors that Qutayla bore Ikrima "a feeble-minded son", which he considers to be the "more trustworthy" version. Ikrima was also married to Asma bint al-Nu'man ibn Abi al-Jawn, another Kindite wife of Muhammad whose marriage had never been consummated. He married her after a relatively short marriage to Ikrima's Makhzumite kinsman al-Muhajir ibn Abi Umayya. Ikrima's wife Umm Hakim married Caliph Umar (r. 634–644) sometime after Ikrima's death.

== Bibliography ==
- Donner, Fred M., ed. (1993). The History of al-Ṭabarī, Volume X: The Conquest of Arabia, A.D. 632–633/A.H. 11. SUNY Series in Near Eastern Studies. Albany, New York: State University of New York Press. ISBN 978-0-7914-1071-4.
- Blankinship, Khalid Yahya, ed. (1993). The History of al-Ṭabarī, Volume XI: The Challenge to the Empires. SUNY Series in Near Eastern Studies. Albany, New York: State University of New York Press. ISBN 978-0-7914-0851-3.
- Gordon, Matthew S.; Robinson, Chase F.; Rowson, Everett K.; Fishbein, Michael, eds. (2018). The Works of Ibn Wāḍiḥ al-Yaʿqūbī (Volume 3): An English Translation. E. J. Brill. ISBN 978-90-04-35621-4.
- Hinds, M. (1991). "Makhzūm". In Bosworth, C. E.; van Donzel, E. & Pellat, Ch. (eds.). The Encyclopaedia of Islam, Second Edition. Volume VI: Mahk–Mid. Leiden: E. J. Brill. pp. 137–140. ISBN 978-90-04-08112-3.
- Landau-Tasseron, Ella, ed. (1998). The History of al-Ṭabarī, Volume XXXIX: Biographies of the Prophet's Companions and their Successors: al-Ṭabarī's Supplement to his History. SUNY Series in Near Eastern Studies. Albany, New York: State University of New York Press. ISBN 978-0-7914-2819-1.
- Lecker, Michael (1998). Jews and Arabs in Pre- and Early Islamic Arabia. Ashgate Variorum. ISBN 0-86078-784-2.
- Umari, Akram Diya (1991). Madīnan Society at the Time of the Prophet, Volume II: The Jihād against the Mushrikūn. Translated by Huda Khattab. Herndon, Virginia: The International Institute of Islamic Thought. ISBN 0-912463-37-6.
