= Thabit ibn Qays =

Companion of Muhammad

Thābit ibn Qays ibn Shammās al-Ḥārithī al-Khazrajī (Arabic: ثابت بن قيس بن شماس الحارثي الخزرجي) was a companion of Muhammad, who served as one of his orators and scribes, and a leader of the Ansar, the natives of Medina who gave Muhammad safe haven in their city and were among the earliest converts to Islam.

Following the Muslim victory at Battle of Dhu al-Qassah at the beginning of the Ridda wars in 632, Caliph Abu Bakr appointed Thabit commander of the Ansarite troops. He was placed under the overall command of Khalid ibn al-Walid. He participated in the subsequent battles of Buzakha (632) against the Asad and Ghatafan nomads under Tulayha and Aqraba (633) against the sedentary Hanifa tribe under Musaylima. At Aqraba he recommended to Khalid that the exclusion of nomad contingents in their army as he blamed them for the repeated, failed attempts to overcome the Hanifa warriors. Khalid accepted this counsel and the Muslims afterward routed and killed Musaylima, and Thabit was killed during fight in the Battle of Yamama.

Alternatively, Chinese Muslims hold that he was involved in the introduction of Islam to China during the Tang dynasty period when he reached China over land and died of in the western Chinese province of Eastern Turkestan (Uyghur).

== Divorce ==
It is said in a narration his wife, Jameelah bint Abdillāh ibn Ubayy ibn Salool asked for divorce and they got divorced after that.

Ibn ‘Abbās said: The wife of Thābit ibn Qays came to Muhammad and said:

“O Messenger of Allah! I find no fault with Thābit ibn Qays in his character or religion, but I would hate to act in disobedience to Islam.” The Messenger of Allah (صلى الله عليه وسلم) said to her: “Will you return to him the garden [that he gave you as a dowry]?” She replied: “Yes.” So Allah's Messenger (صلى الله عليه وسلم) said to Thābit: “Accept the garden and divorce her with one pronouncement.” (Bukhāri, 5273) In another narration, Ibn ‘Abbās said: “He commanded him to divorce her.” (Bukhāri, 5274)

This is the first hadeeth quoted by Al-Hāfidh Ibn Hajr (d. 852H) in his Buloogh Al-Marām, Chapter of Khula’ (باب الخلع).

Amr ibn Shu’ayb reported from his father, from his grandfather that Thābit ibn Qays was unattractive and his wife said: “If it was not for the fear of Allah, when Thābit entered in my presence, I would have spat in his face.” (Ibn Mājah, 2057 and declared weak by Al-Albāni) Also, Ahmad reported in his Musnad (16095) from Sahl ibn Abee Hathmah that: “This was the first Khula’ in Islam.”

== Promise of Paradise ==
It is reported He was promised Paradise.

Sahih al-Bukhari 3613

Narrated Anas bin Malik:

The Prophet (ﷺ) noticed the absence of Thabit bin Qais. A man said, "O Allah's Messenger (ﷺ)! I shall bring you his news." So he went to him and saw him sitting in his house drooping his head (sadly). He asked Thabit, "What's the matter?" Thabit replied, "An evil situation: A man used to raise his voice over the voice of the Prophet (ﷺ) and so all his good deeds have been annulled and he is from the people of Hell." The man went back and told the Prophet (ﷺ) that Thabit had said so-and-so. (The sub-narrator, Musa bin Anas said, "The man went to Thabit again with glad tidings)." The Prophet (ﷺ) said to him, "Go and say to Thabit: 'You are not from the people of Fire, but from the people of Paradise."

== The title of Khatib of Islam ==
The title "Khatib-e-Islam" was first used for Thabit bin Qais Ansari , who used to attend various meetings as a representative of Muhammad. He was also remembered by the titles of Khatib-ul-Ansar and Khatib-e-Rasool-e-Karim.

== Bibliography ==
- Kister, M. J. (2002). "The Struggle against Musaylima and the Conquest of Yamama". Jerusalem Studies in Arabic and Islam. 27: 1–56.
- Donner, Fred M., ed. (1993). The History of al-Ṭabarī, Volume X: The Conquest of Arabia, A.D. 632–633/A.H. 11. SUNY Series in Near Eastern Studies. Albany, New York: State University of New York Press. ISBN 978-0-7914-1071-4.
- Poonawala, Ismail, ed. (1990). The History of al-Ṭabarī, Volume IX: The Last Years of the Prophet: The Formation of the State, A.D. 630–632/A.H. 8–11. SUNY Series in Near Eastern Studies. Albany, New York: State University of New York Press. ISBN 978-0-88706-691-7.
