= 632 =

Calendar year

632 in various calendars
- Gregorian calendar: 632; DCXXXII
- Ab urbe condita: 1385
- Armenian calendar: 81; ԹՎ ՁԱ
- Assyrian calendar: 5382
- Balinese saka calendar: 553–554
- Bengali calendar: 38–39
- Berber calendar: 1582
- Buddhist calendar: 1176
- Burmese calendar: −6
- Byzantine calendar: 6140–6141
- Chinese calendar: 辛卯年 (Metal Rabbit); 3329 or 3122 — to — 壬辰年 (Water Dragon); 3330 or 3123
- Coptic calendar: 348–349
- Discordian calendar: 1798
- Ethiopian calendar: 624–625
- Hebrew calendar: 4392–4393
- Hindu calendars
- Vikram Samvat: 688–689
- Shaka Samvat: 553–554
- Kali Yuga: 3732–3733
- Holocene calendar: 10632
- Iranian calendar: 10–11
- Islamic calendar: 10–11
- Japanese calendar: N/A
- Javanese calendar: 522–523
- Julian calendar: 632; DCXXXII
- Korean calendar: 2965
- Minguo calendar: 1280 before ROC 民前1280年
- Nanakshahi calendar: −836
- Seleucid era: 943/944 AG
- Thai solar calendar: 1174–1175
- Tibetan calendar: ལྕགས་མོ་ཡོས་ལོ་ (female Iron-Hare); 758 or 377 or −395 — to — ཆུ་ཕོ་འབྲུག་ལོ་ (male Water-Dragon); 759 or 378 or −394

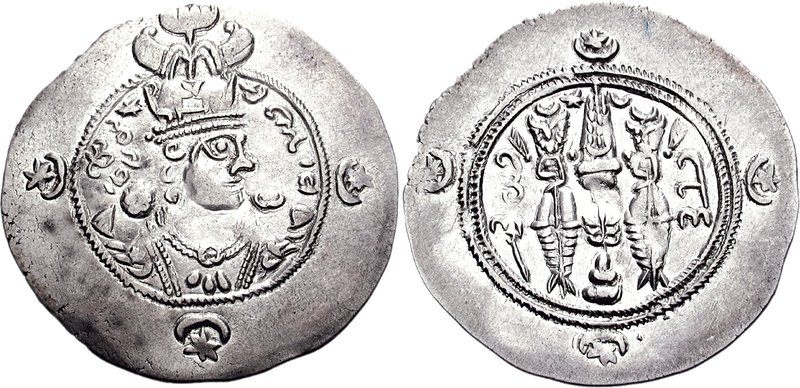
King Yazdegerd III of Persia (632–651)

Year 632 (DCXXXII) was a leap year starting on Wednesday of the Julian calendar. The denomination 632 for this year has been used since the early medieval period, when the Anno Domini calendar era became the prevalent method in Europe for naming years.

== Events ==
=== By place ===
==== Arabia ====
- March 18 (approximate) – Muhammad makes his final sermon to the Muslims.
- June 8 – Muhammad dies at Medina at the age of 63, after an illness and fever.
- June – Abu Bakr (born Abdallah ibn Uthman ibn Amir, better known by his Islamic laqab Al-Siddiq) becomes the Caliph.
- June – The first caliph, Abu Bakr, sends an expedition to Balqa, Byzantine Empire, led by Usama ibn Zayd. This expedition is sent based on Muhammad's decision before his death.
- Ridda Wars: Abu Bakr launches a series of military campaigns against rebel Arabian tribes, to re-establish the power of the Rightly Guided Caliphs, and to secure Muhammad's legacy.
- September – Battle of Buzakha: An Islamic column (6,000 men) under Khalid ibn al-Walid defeats the Apostate rebels under Tulayha, near Ha'il (Saudi Arabia).
- December – Battle of Aqraba: The Muslim forces of Abu Bakr defeat the Apostate rebels (40,000 men) under Musaylimah, on the plain of Aqraba.

==== Europe ====
- April 8 – King Charibert II is assassinated at Blaye (Gironde), (possibly on orders of his half-brother Dagobert I), along with his infant son. Dagobert I claims Aquitaine and Gascony, becoming the most powerful Merovingian king in the West.
- Part of Samo's rebellion, Alciocus leads 9,000 Bulgars from Pannonia to refuge with Dagobert (who massacres them), then, with 700 survivors, settles with the Wends, under the protection of Walluc.
- Kubrat, ruler of the Dulo clan, takes power from the Pannonian Avars and establishes Old Great Bulgaria in the area of Black Cumania. Kubrat's rule stretches from Dacia to Poltava.

==== Persia ====
- June 16 – Yazdegerd III, age 8, ascends to the throne as king (shah) of the Persian Empire. He becomes the last ruler of the Sassanid Dynasty (modern Iran).

==== Asia ====
- January 27 – An annular eclipse of the sun occurs.
- Seondeok is crowned queen of Silla (Korea).

==== Armenia ====
- The 632 Armenia earthquake affects the region of the Armenian Highlands.

=== By topic ===
==== Religion ====
- March 6 (Friday, 9 Zulhijja, 10 AH) – The Farewell Sermon (Khuṭbatu l-Wadāʿ) is delivered by Muhammad, Islamic prophet, in the Uranah valley of Mount Arafat, to the Muslims who have accompanied him for the Hajj (pilgrimage).
- June 8 – Muhammad dies in Medina, at the age of 62, and is succeeded by Abu Bakr who becomes the first caliph (vicegerent of the messenger of God). He establishes the Rashidun Caliphate until 661.
- Xuanzang, Chinese traveler, writes about two huge statues of Buddha carved out of a mountainside in the Bamiyan Valley (Afghanistan).

== Births ==
- Al-Muhallab ibn Abi Sufra, Arab general (d. 702)
- Vindicianus, bishop of Cambrai (approximate date)

== Deaths ==
- January 27 – Ibrahim, son of Muhammad
- January 31 – Máedóc, bishop of Ferns
- April 8 – Charibert II, king of Aquitaine
- June 8 – Muhammad, Islamic Prophet (b. 570)
- August 11 – Rusticula (b. c. 556), abbess of Arles
- August 28 – Fatimah, daughter of Muhammad
- October 12 or 633 – Edwin of Northumbria, king of Deira and Bernicia
- October 29 – Saint Colman mac Duagh, Irish abbot and bishop
- Abu Dujana, companion of Muhammad
- Chilperic, son of Charibert II
- Abdullah ibn Suhayl (b. 594) (martyred)
- Abu Hudhayfa ibn Utba (b. 581) (martyred)
- Salim Mawla Abu Hudhayfa (b. c. 594–596) (martyred)
- Zayd ibn al-Khattab (b. before 584) (martyred)
- Musaylimah, Arabian prophet
