= Ibn an-Nawwahah =

Messenger of Musaylimah

Abdullah ibn an-Nawwahah (عبدالله إبن النواحة) was a messenger sent by Musaylimah, a claimant to prophethood active in the Yamamah region during the time of the Islamic prophet Muhammad. He is primarily known for delivering a message from Musaylimah to Muhammad and for his later execution following Muhammad's death.

== Background ==
Musaylimah gained a significant following in Yamamah, partly due to local tribal dynamics. Many within the Banu Hanifah tribe (part of the larger Rabiah tribal grouping) harbored hostility towards Muhammad and the Quraysh tribe based in the Hijaz. This sentiment was reportedly expressed by one individual from Rabiah who stated, "...a liar of the Rabi'ah tribe of Yamamah is better than a truthful person of the Mazar tribe of the Hijaz". Musaylimah's following was also attributed to his teachings, tricks, and claimed miracles.

== Mission to Muhammad ==
Ibn an-Nawwahah, possibly accompanied by other envoys, traveled to Medina to deliver a message from Musaylimah to Muhammad. The core of the message was a proposal that the world (or authority) should be divided between Musaylimah and Muhammad, recognizing both as prophets of Allah. Muhammad rejected this proposal, stating that the division of the earth is decided by Allah alone. According to a hadith recorded in Sunan Abu Dawood, Muhammad questioned the messengers about their own beliefs regarding Musaylimah. They replied, "We believe as he believes." Muhammad then stated, "I swear by Allah that were it not that messengers are not killed, I would cut off your heads." This indicated that, at the time of their visit, Ibn an-Nawwahah and any companions were protected by diplomatic immunity accorded to messengers.

== Execution ==
Following the death of Muhammad and during the subsequent Ridda Wars, the status of Ibn an-Nawwahah changed. Harithah ibn Mudarrib reported encountering Abdullah ibn Mas'ud, a prominent companion of Muhammad, after passing a mosque of the Banu Hanifah where people were affirming belief in Musaylimah. Ibn Mas'ud had these individuals brought before him and offered them the chance to repent. However, he singled out Ibn an-Nawwahah, recalling Muhammad's earlier statement about wishing to execute him but being prevented by his status as a messenger. Ibn Mas'ud declared, "But today you are not a messenger." He then ordered Qarazah ibn Ka'b to carry out the execution. Ibn an-Nawwahah was subsequently beheaded publicly in the marketplace.

== See also ==
- Non-Muslim interactants with Muslims during Muhammad's era
- Ridda Wars
- Banu Hanifah
