= Sajah =

7th-century Arab Christian self-declared prophetess

- Born: 598
- Died: 675 CE
- Known for: Being part of Wars of Apostasy
- Spouse: Musaylimah
- Father: Al-Harith ibn Suwayd

Sajah bint Al-Harith ibn Suwayd al-Tamimi (Arabic: سجاح بنت الحارث بن سويد التميمية, fl. 598-675 CE) from the tribe of Banu Tamim, was an Arab Christian known for claiming to be a prophet in late antique Arabia. She is the only known female prophetess of pre-Islamic Arabia, and her career has been compared with the general trend of Prophet claimants on the Arabian Peninsula in the sixth and seventh centuries.

She was protected by her tribe at first; then causing a split within the Arab tribes and finally defended by Banu Hanifa. Sajah was one of a series of people (including her future husband) to claim to be prophets in the aftermath of the death of Muhammad. She is said to have converted to Islam after the rise of Muhammad and died as a Muslim.

== Biography ==
Her full nisba was Sijah bint al-Harith bin Suwaid at-Tamimi. According to Muhammad Suhail Taqu̅sh, Arab culture and Turkic history professor of Imam al-Awza’i University, Sajah was a Christian who also worked as a shaman. Her father was a chief of Banu Yarbu, a clan of Banu Tamim, which has dominant Christians populace after their frequent contact with the Christianity influences from the Euphrates Region. Her mother came from Bani Taghlib from the Lower Mesopotamia region. However, according to Meir Jacob Kister, Arabist from Hebrew University of Jerusalem, it was instead Sajah's father, Al-Harith ibn Suwayd, who belonged to the Banu Taghlib tribe of Iraq.

During Sajah's lifetime, the Tamim tribe were subjects of the Sasanian Empire. This relationship was established through the Kingdom of Hira, which was an extension of the Persian Empire. Persian traders passed through several regions first to reach Hira. Bani Tamim played a role in maintaining the security of Persian trade caravans that crossed the Arabian Peninsula. Meanwhile, due to their adherence to Christian religion, the Tamim tribe also develop close relationship with the Christians of the Euphrates region and northern Syria. The Yarbu branch which Sajah hailed from gained political monopoly in Souk Okaz, as one of their chiefs was entrusted as an arbitrator and judge of the market. However, their domination of Souk Okaz came to an abrupt end two years before Muhammad began preaching Islam.

After the death of Muhammad, Sajah proclaimed herself as a prophetess. Modern Lebanese historian Muhammad Suhail Taqoush forwarded a theory, suspecting that Sajah's proclamation was motivated by a political move to unite the Tamim confederation branches. At first, Sajah came into Hizn region, where she managed to gain the allegiance from Bani Malik under Waki' ibn Malik, and Banu Yarbu' under Malik ibn Nuwayra. However, her proclamation was not entirely successful. Although the Taghlib tribe under Hudhayl ibn 'Imran pledged their allegiance and abandoned Christianity, the majority of the Banu Tamim clans rejected her call, which made Sajah give up hope of getting the support from the majority of her own kinsmen. As the Ridda wars broke out, she moved into al-Yamama, where she joined forces with Musaylima in anti-Medinese coalition. Thereafter, 4000 people gathered around her to march on Medina. Others joined her against Medina. However, her planned attack on Medina was called off after she learned that the army of Khalid ibn al-Walid had defeated Tulayha al-Asadi (another self-proclaimed prophet). As the time passed on, the alliance came into abrupt end as Musaylima grew suspicious towards Sajah. Thus, Sajah left Musaylima alone to fought against the Muslim army in al-Yamama.

After the Battle of Yamama, where Musaylima was killed, sources mention that Sajah converted to Islam after giving up her claim of prophethood and died after 661 during the reign of Mu'awiya I. Other source said Sajah returned to the settlement of Taghlib tribe after the death of Musaylima, and then she converted to Islam and lived in Basra, where she lived her death 675 AD. After her death, Samura ibn Jundab, the governor of Basra, led the funeral prayer for her.

== See also ==
- Musaylimah
- Al-Aswad Al-Ansi
- Layla bint al-Minhal
- Hind bint Utbah
- Saf ibn Sayyad
- Ridda wars
