= Saf ibn Sayyad =

Claimant of prophethood

- الصف بن الصياد
- Born: 613 AD; Al Medina Region, Arabian Peninsula (now Saudi Arabia)
- Disappeared: August 683; Harrat Waqim, Medina, Hejaz, Umayyad Caliphate (now Saudi Arabia)
- Other name: Abdullah ibn Sa'id
- Known for: Claimant of Prophethood; Being a disguised allusion of Ad-Dajjal
- Father: Sayyad

Saf ibn Sayyad (Arabic: الصف بن الصياد), later known as Abdullah ibn Sayyad (Arabic: عبد الله ابن صياد) or just Ibn Sayyad, was an alleged claimant of prophethood during the time of Islamic prophet Muhammad and his companions who later disappeared after the Ridda wars. Umar, a senior companion of Muhammad, and even some Islamic scholars today, speculate that he might be the Dajjal, who, according to Islamic beliefs, is the false Messiah and a major sign of the end of the world.

== Early life ==
He was born to an Arab Jewish family near Medina.

== Alleged claims of prophethood in childhood ==
According to the Sahih Muslim, a Sunni Muslim religious text, Ibn Sayyad allegedly claimed he was a prophet as an early adolescent:

It was narrated that Muhammad met Ibn Sayyad, at that time Ibn Sayyad was just at the threshold of adolescence. Muhammad said: "Don't you bear testimony to the fact that I am the Messenger of Allah?" Ibn Sayyad said: "No, but you should bear testimony that I am the messenger of Allah." After Ibn Sayyad jests about being a prophet, Umar ibn Khattab decided that the child deserved death and asked Muhammad for permission to execute him. Thereupon Muhammad said: "If he is that person [the Dajjal] who is in your mind, you will not be able to kill him, and if he is not, then killing will not do you any good."

== Adulthood ==
Nafi' reported that Ibn 'Umar met Ibn Sayyad (now known as Abdullah ibn Sa'id) and said to some of his friends: "You state that it was he (the Dajjal)." Ibn Sa'id said: "By Allah, it is not so". Ibn 'Umar said: "You have not told me the truth; by Allah some of you informed me that he would not die until he would have the largest number of offspring and huge wealth and it is he about whom it is thought so."

However, Abu Sa'id al-Khudri reported: "Ibn Sayyad said to me something for which I felt ashamed. He said: I can excuse others; but what has gone wrong with you, O Companions of Muhammad, that you take me as Dajjal? Has Allah's Apostle (ﷺ) not said that he would be a Jew whereas I am a Muslim and he also said that he would not have children, whereas I have children, and he also said: verily, Allah has prohibited him to enter Mecca whereas I have performed Pilgrimage".

Due to these constant claims against him, Ibn Sa'id became depressed, stating: "I think I should take a rope and tie it to the tree and commit suicide because of the talks of the people." (Sahih Muslim 54:114)

== Disappearance ==
Saf ibn Sayyad was last seen during the Battle of al-Harra, where the Umayyad Caliph Yazid I had sent a force to subjugate the city of Medina.

He reportedly disappeared during the battle and was never seen again.

== See also ==
- Al-Aswad Al-Ansi
- List of people who disappeared mysteriously (pre-1910)
- Musaylimah
- Sajah
- Tulayha
