= Battle of Naqra =

Coordinates: 24.617387°N 46.546303°E

The Battle of Naqra took place in October 633 between rebel armies and Khalid ibn al-Walid's army during the Ridda Wars.

After the defeat of Tulayha in the Battle of Buzakha, the tribe Banu Sulaym under the leadership of Amr bin Abdul Uzza(Abu Shajara) remained defiant to oppose the force led by Khalid ibn Walid.

Both Khalid bin Waleed and Abu Shajara formed up the armies at Naqra and the battle ensues as Bani Sulaim gave a stubborn resistance. As the battle rages on, the Muslim forces steadily gained the upper hand until the entire rebel forces were routed.

While most of the rebels were slaughtered and some had fled, their leader Abu Shajara was taken prisoner.

== On-line Resources ==
A.I. Akram, The Sword of Allah: Khalid bin al-Waleed, His Life and Campaigns Lahore, 1969
