= Battle of Ghamra =

Coordinates: 30.074942°N 31.264569°E

- Part of Ridda wars and Campaigns of Khalid ibn al-Walid
Date	September 632
Location	Ghamra, 20 miles from Buzakha, Arabia
Result	Rashidun Caliphate victory

Belligerents
Rashidun Caliphate	Pagan Arab tribes

Commanders and leaders
Khalid ibn al-Walid; Adi ibn Hatim	Tulayha; Hibal; Uyaina (POW)

Casualties and losses
Low	Heavy

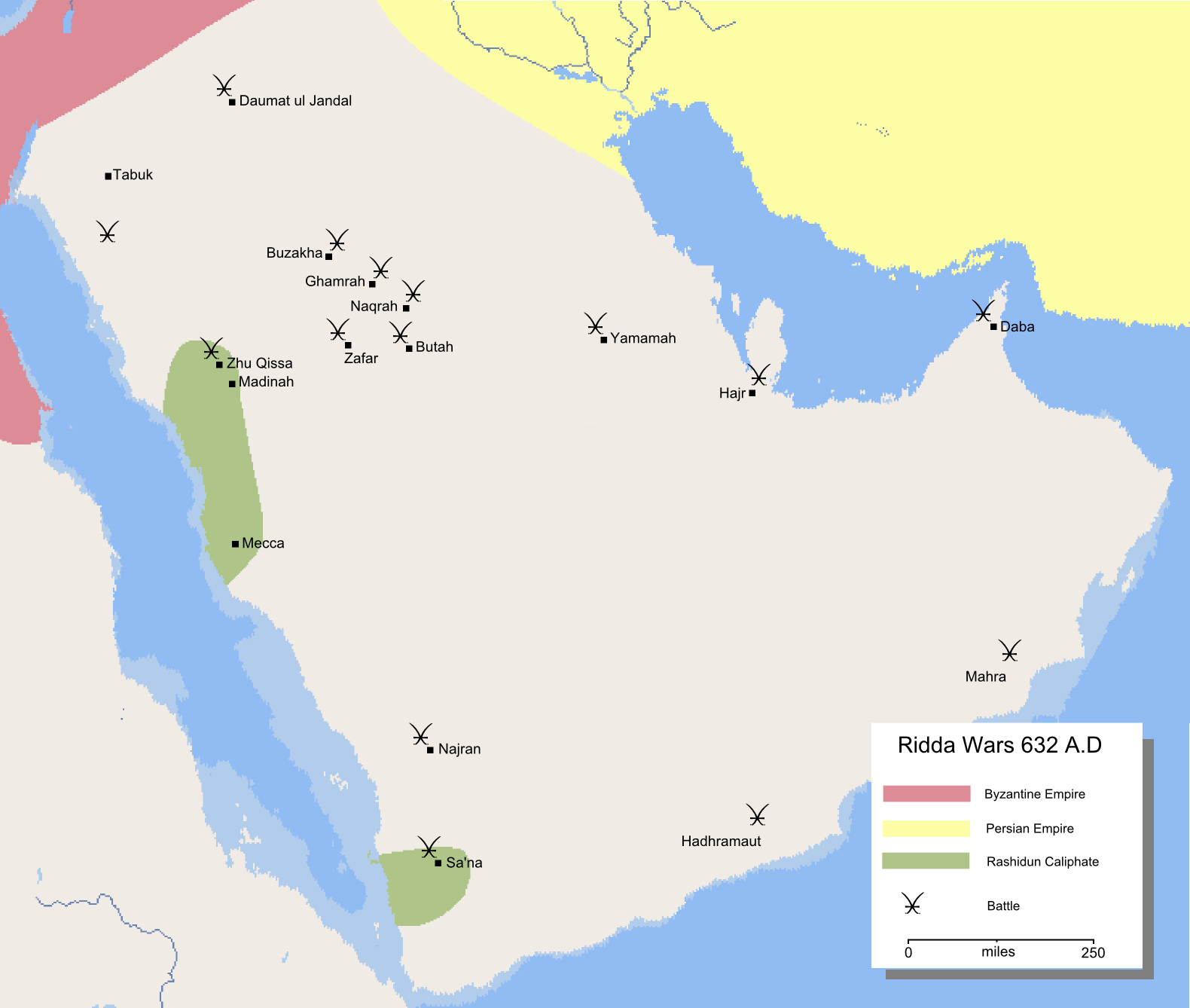
Map of major conflicts during the Riddah Wars

The Battle of Ghamra took place between Muslim Arab general Khalid ibn al-Walid and the remaining army of Buzakha, 20 miles from Buzakha.

== Online Resources ==
A.I. Akram, The Sword of Allah: Khalid bin al-Waleed, His Life and Campaigns Lahore, 1969
