= Maslama =

Maslama مسلمة
- Pronunciation: /mɑzlɑmə/
- Gender: Male

Origin
- Origin: Semitic (Arabic)
- Meaning: Peace, safety and security.
- Region of origin: Arabia (Middle East)

Maslama or Maslamah (Arabic: مَسْلَمة maslamah) is an Arabic male given name and sometimes female, meaning "peace, safety and security from every calamity, disease, evil, misfortune, ordeal, pestilence, damage, harm, disaster, injury, affliction", "conciliate, re-conciliate, peacemaking, compromise", "guiltless, ingenuous, innocent, naive, simple", "compliant, flexible, obedient, god-fearing, submissive (pious), acceptance" and "deliverance, rescue, salvation".

The name Maslama stems from the male noun-name Salaam.

Maslama or Maslamah can refer to:

- Maslama ibn Mukhallad al-Ansari (616/620 – 682), companion of Muhammad and governor of Egypt
- Maslama ibn Habib (died 632), better known as Musaylamah, "false Prophet" at the time of Muhammad
- Maslama ibn Abd al-Malik (died 738), Umayyad prince and general against the Byzantines and Khazars
- Maslama ibn Hisham, Umayyad prince, son of Caliph Hisham
- Maslama ibn Yahya al-Bajali, governor of Egypt in 789
- Maslama al-Majriti (died 1007/8), Muslim scholar, astronomer and mathematician from al-Andalus
