= Battle of Buzakha =

7th-century battle of the Ridda Wars

- Part of Ridda wars and Campaigns of Khalid ibn al-Walid
Date	September 632
Location	Buzakha, 25 miles southwest of Ha'il, Arabia
Result	Rashidun Caliphate victory

Belligerents
Rashidun Caliphate; Tayy Tribe	Pagan Arab tribes

Commanders and leaders
Khalid ibn al-Walid; Adi ibn Hatim	Tulayha; Hibal; Uyayna ibn Hisn

Strength
6,000	35,000

Casualties and losses
Low	Heavy casualties

The Battle of Buzakha was a major military battle in the Ridda Wars or Wars of Apostasy. It took place between the army of the Rashidun Caliphate under command of Khalid ibn al-Walid and the Apostate forces under Tulayha, in September 632.

== Strength ==
Khalid had 6,000 men under his command while Tulayha had 35,000 men.

== General engagement ==
Tuhlaya himself took up a position somewhere to the rear of his centre, under the pretext of seeking guidance from Allah whilst the battle raged, keeping a camel near him in case of retreat. The apostate army, much like the Muslims, was ranged with a centre and wings, with individual clans grouped together. The apostate army was commanded by one Uyaina, who also personally commanded the elite 700 Bani Hazari unit in the centre. Setting out of his camp, Khalid ordered a general attack along the whole line. The Muslims managed to dent the apostate front at several places, greatly pushing the wings back. Around this time, Uyaina rode to Tuhlaya and asked him for God's advice, to which the former simply replied with encouragement. After some more time, Khalid managed to make dents into his foe's centre, although the ground was more bitterly given by Uyaina's Banu Hazari. After another two rounds of asking Tuhlaya's advice - to no avail - Uyaina suspected his master of falsehood, and immediately ordered the Banu Hazari to withdraw from the field. The remainder of the apostate army, already under pressure, soon broke under Muslims' attacks. Some isolated groups continued resistance, until they saw Tuhlaya and his family flee the battlefield on camel-back, after which they too fled. Immediately after the rout, Khalid sent flying columns to pursue the remnants of the army. Some 30 miles southeast of the field, one Muslim column overtook some of the apostates, who immediately surrendered without a struggle. Khalid personally led a column north, overtaking a largely intact part of the routed army 60 miles out at Ghamra, commanded by Uyaina and composed of his Banu Hazari. After some initial resistance, the rebels were overwhelmed and fled, and Uyaina was captured.

== Aftermath ==
After the rebels of Banu Asad had been brought down, Khalid continued his march to complete his mission to the series of pacification of the nearby uprising in the area of Naqra, which happened to be incited by the tribe of Banu Sulaym which was led by Amr bin Abdul Uzza(Abu Shajara). After Khalid from here went on to his next objective and almost a month later engaged salma at the battle of Zafar. Ghatafan tribes got subjected and Islamized by Khalid.

Tulayha on the other hand had killed a veteran Companions of the Prophet of the Prophet by the name of Ukasha Bin Mihsan faced a ban from joining in any war. He later asked for forgiveness from Caliph Abu Bakr, who forgave him but he was, along with his tribe, banned from joining in any external campaigns as they had indulged in apostasy and so couldn't be trusted. It would be in Caliph Umar's reign that they would be finally allowed to participate in battles.

Tulayha served with great distinction in the later Persian campaign, especially in the Battle of Qadisiya and the Battle of Nihawand.
