= Qays ibn Makshuh =

Yemeni Arab noble, Companion of Muhammad

Qays ibn Makshuh al-Muradi قيس بن المكشوح المرادي
- Born: Unknown; Yemen
- Military career
- Allegiance: Rashidun Caliphate.
- Branch: Rashidun army
- Nickname: Abu Shaddad
- Known for: The Knight of the Arabs and one of the great leaders in the conquest of the Levant and the Battles of Yarmouk and al-Qadisiyah

Qays ibn Makshuh al-Muradi (Arabic: قيس بن المكشوح المرادي), or also known as Qays ibn Hubayrah; was a companion of Muhammad. He converted to Islam during the life of Muhammad. He later rebelled during Ridda Wars after the killing of Al-Aswad al-Ansi, only to be defeated by Ikrima ibn Abi Jahl.

Qays was later pardoned by first Rashidun caliph Abu Bakr and participated in the Muslim conquest of Persia and Muslim conquest of the Levant.

== Biography ==
Qays ibn Mashuh al-Muradi hailed from Murad tribe as son of Makshuh, or originally named Hubayrah ibn Abd Yaghut bin Al-Ghazil bin Salamah, the son of Bada’ ibn Amr az Zahir bin Murad. The father of Qays was the chief of Murad tribe and nicknamed al-Makshuh because he had a complaint in his flank resulting from a fire. There is some confusion about his name, which sometimes appears in records as Qays ibn Hubayra "al-Makshuh,” or Qays ibn 'Abd Yaghuth ibn Makshuh, or simply Qays ibn al-Makshfih. Qays ibn Makshuh was also a nephew of Amr ibn Ma'adi Yakrib, a renowned warrior from Zubaid clan of Yemen.

Later, when there was news about a Quraysh man named Muhammad preaching an religion named Islam in Arabia, Amr urged Qays ibn Maksuh to go with him to check whether Muhammad's claim of being a prophet is true, Qays declined. Then in turn, Amr went by himself to meet Muhammad, who impressed him and prompted him to convert to Islam as he met the latter.

=== Ridda Wars ===
During the great Ridda Wars, the false prophet Al-Aswad al-Ansi succumbed to a palace conspiracy, as Yemeni leaders, such as Dhu Zulaim, Dhu al-Kala, and Dhu Murran withheld their support from Aswad. When the tribes of Najran broke away and reinstate dtreaty with Medina, Aswad lost significant support. This weakness allow Qays ibn Makshuh and Persian garrison led by Fayruz al-Daylami in San'a to mount conspiracy operation The operation finally managed brought down Aswad and reaffirmed the caliphate control of the area.

The threat to the authority of Medina, however, was renewed in the person of Qais ibn Makshuh himself, as he felt slighted when Abu Bakr confirmed Fairuz as administrator of Yemen. Meanwhile, another source suggested Qays rebelled along with Amr ibn Ma'adi Yakrib as both conspired to kill three caliphate deputies in Yemen. A caliphate commander Al-Muhajir ibn Abi Umayya lead the Al-Abna' opposing Qays. Ultimately, the forces of Qays and Amr were defeated by the force of Ikrima ibn Abi Jahl.

=== Muslim conquests ===
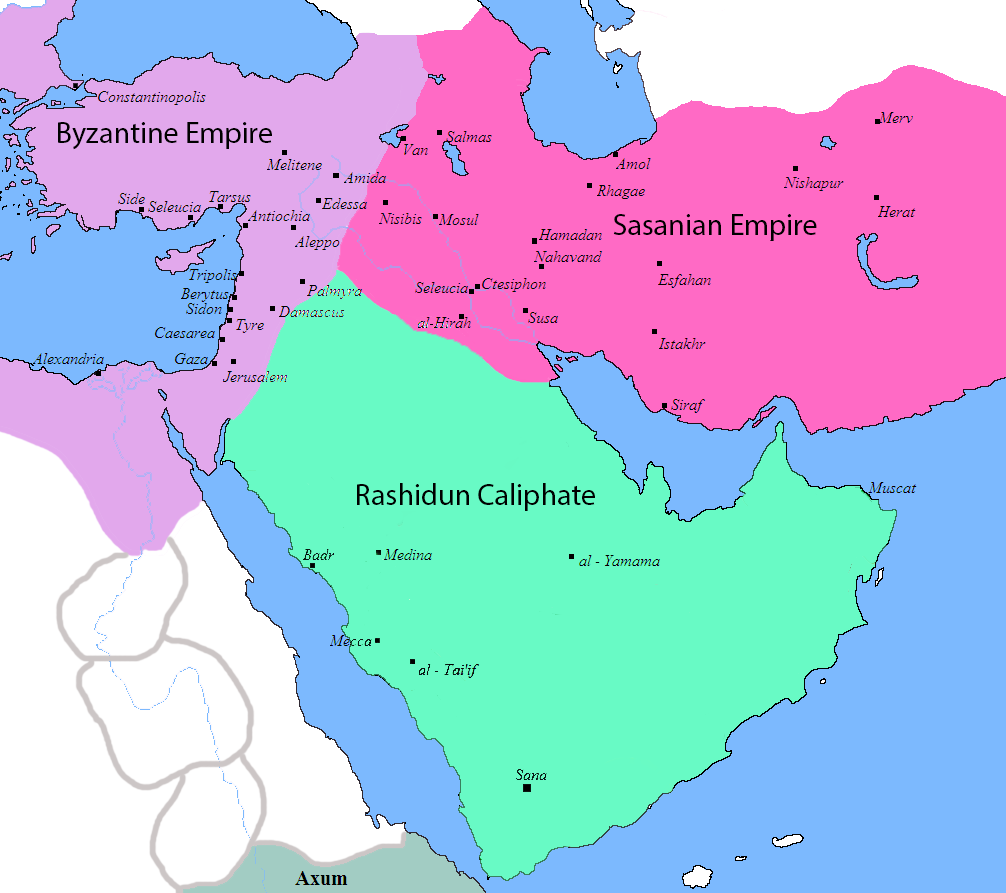
Map of the borders on the onset of Muslim early conquest.

After Ridda wars, Qays mobilizing his own wealth and led the soldiers from Yemen that came to Medina to participate in early Muslim conquests. On the onset of the famous battle of Yarmuk in 636 AD, around 3,000 cavalry reinforcements were sent to the Muslim conquest of Syria front, including those from Yemen which led by Qays ibn Makshuh.

During the first day Battle of Beisan (634), Khalid bin Al-Walid comes out at the front of the army in other skirmishes with the front of the Roman army in 1,500 cavalry, dividing his army into three sections which he led the center while the right wing led by Qays ibn Maqshuh and the left wing was led by Maysara ibn Masruq. One of the Byzantine battalion advanced but repelled by Qays, causing both sides to return as the clash casualties were minimal. On the final stage of the battle, the Rashidun cavalry immediately formed their battle formation with Qays on the left and Maysara on the center and facing their chasing enemies. As the entire cavalry under Qays, Khaled, and Maysarah has engaged the vanguard of the Byzantine the incoming additional Rashidun forces under Muadh ibn Jabal, Sa'id ibn Zayd, and Hashim ibn Utbah approaching them. Muadh immediately reinforcing Maysara behind his cavalry forces, while Sa'id and Hashim also reinforcing him from different sides. As the battle ended at night, almost the whole 80,000 soldiers of Byzantine under Saqlar were slain, while the Rashidun forces suffered several hundreds of casualties.

Qays participated in the battle of Yarmuk. In the battle of al-Yarmuk, Khalid ibn al-Walid appoint Qays al-Makshuh as commander of the cavalry on the left wing rear. However, al-Ash‘ath ibn Qays, Hashim ibn Utbah, and Qays ibn Makshuh, each lost an eye during this battle.

It is said that during the conquest of Persia Qays had duelled against two Persian commanders, each commanding 10,000 and won against both, where this accident then reported to the caliph. Ibn Hisham has reported the warning of Amr towards Qays ibn Makshuh, as Qays has threatened Salman ibn Rabia al-Bahili, administrator of the caliphate stable and Hima(camels massive breeding livestock in Nejd), which responded by Amr who reprimanded Qays from threatening Salman with advising poet to beware of such prideful attitude while reminding him the fate of the strength of the powerful ʿĀd peoples which preceding them does not helping them to avert disaster from them.

Later, caliph Abu Bakar asking Qays about how will he fight the Persians, which replied by Qays:

"If you and your majesty are still alive, someone will tell you about me, how I protect the Muslims and how far I have fought against the disbelievers."

Later, Amr participated in the battle of Jalula, where he reported to played important role during this battle along with al-Qa'qa, Tulayha, Hijr ibn 'Adi, and Qays ibn Maksuh. At night, Al-Qa'qa brings a number of elite cavalry to they reached the door of the ditch. Among these horsemen are veterans such as Amr, Tulayha, Qays ibn Maksuh and Hijr ibn Adi along with several Zubaidi clan horsemen. As the battle started According to firsthand witness named Muhaffiz, al Qa'qa units including Amr and the others managed to slip inside the trench between Jalula fortress and the still engaging Sassanid army, capturing the said trench while the main army of Sassanid under command of Khurrazad still busy fight the Rashidun main forces. This act caused panic among the Sassanids as they began retreating, while the Rashidun forces, noticing al-Qa'qa and his units has penetrated and taking position on the trench behind the Sassanid army. It is said the entire battlefield were scattered by corpses of the Sassanid army, thus became the name of the area and this historical battlefield as "Jalula" (dead bodies scattered around).
