= Wahshi ibn Harb =

Companion of the Prophet Muhammad

- وحشي بن حرب
- Born: c. 600; Habasha
- Died: 660 (aged 60); Homs
- Other name: Abu Dusmah
- Known for: Killing Muhammad's uncle, Hamza in the Battle of Uhud; Killing Musaylimah in the Battle of Yamama
- Relatives: Wahshi ibn Harb ibn Wahshi (grandson)

Waḥshī ibn Ḥarb al-Habashi (Arabic: وحشي بن حرب الحبشي, lit. 'The Savage, son of War, the Ethiopian'), also known as Abu Dusmah, was a former slave of Jubayr ibn Mut'im before becoming a freedman and a Sahabi (companion of the Islamic prophet Muhammad). He is best known for killing a leading Muslim fighter, Hamza ibn ‘Abd al-Muttalib, Muhammad's paternal uncle, prior to converting to Islam, and afterwards reportedly killing Musaylimah, the leader of an enemy apostate army waging war against the Muslims. Wahshi's grandson, Wahshi ibn Harb ibn Wahshi ibn Harb, was a Hadith narrator.

== During the Battle of Uhud ==
Wahshi (وحشي, which means "the savage" or "the wild one") had been appointed by Hind bint Utbah to kill one of the three persons (Muhammad, Ali ibn Abi Talib, or Hamza ibn ‘Abd al-Muttalib) to avenge her father's death during the Battle of Badr.

Wahshi said in reply, "I didn't approach Muhammad at all, because his companions are nearer to him than anyone else. Ali too is extraordinarily vigilant in the battlefield. However, Hamza is so furious that, while fighting, he does not pay any attention to any other side and it is possible that I may be able to make him fall by some trick or by taking him unawares." Hind was content with this and promised that if he was successful in performing the job she would set him free. Some believe that Jubayr made this promise to his slave (Wahshi) as his (Jubayr's) uncle had been killed in the Battle of Badr.

== Conversion to Islam ==
Wahshi later converted to Islam and claimed to have killed Musaylimah (also known as Musaylimah al-Kadhdhaab meaning "Musaylimah the Liar") during the Battle of Yamama in 632. Wahshi relates his story of conversion:

After the Battle of Uhud, I continued to live in Makkah for quite a long time until the Muslims conquered Makkah. I then ran away to Ta'if, but soon Islam reached that area as well. I heard that however grave the crime of a person might be, [God] forgave him. I, therefore, reached [Muhammad] with Shahadatayn on my lips. Muhammad saw me and said "Are you the same Wahshi, the Ethiopian?" I replied in the affirmative. Thereupon he said: "How did you kill Hamza ibn Abd al-Muttalib?" I gave an account of the matter. Muhammad was moved and said: "I should not see your face until you are resurrected, because the heart-rending calamity fell upon my uncle at your hands". (It is explained by Islamic scholars that the reason for Wahshi avoiding Muhammad, was not out of continued anger against Wahshi, but in case Wahshi interpreted a look on the face of Muhammad as anger for him, which would therefore make him distraught.) Wahshi says: "So long as Muhammad was alive I kept myself hidden from him. After his death the battle with Musaylimah took place. I joined the army of Islam and used the same weapon against Musaylimah and succeeded in killing him with the help of one of the Ansar. If I killed the best of men (Hamza ibn Abd al-Muttalib) with this weapon, the worst man, too, did not escape its terror.

— Conversation of Wahshi ibn Harb and the incident related to Hamza ibn Abdul-Muttalib

== See also ==
- 7th century in Lebanon : for the Sahaba who have visited them
- List of non-Arab Sahaba
- Sunni view of the Sahaba
