= Al-Aswad al-Ansi =

7th-century Arab tribal leader and self-proclaimed prophet

Abhala bin Ka'b al-Aswad al-Ansi (Arabic: عبهلة بن كعب الاسود العنسي; died June 632) was a 7th-century leader of the Banu Ans tribe and a self-proclaimed prophet, one of the four major figures who declared to be prophets during the Riddah Wars.

== Biography ==
He was born near Najran and later lived in Yemen and proclaimed his prophethood towards the end of the Islamic prophet Muhammad's lifetime. He was also known as "the Veiled," or Dhu al-Khimar (Arabic: ذو الخمار), as he used to cover his face to create an aura of mystery.

A soothsayer and sorcerer, Aswad had the ability to dazzle a crowd with tricks. According to tradition, he had a donkey whom he had trained to kneel before him: he would tell the donkey "Kneel before your lord" and it would kneel, and then he would say to it "Bow before your lord" and it would bow. From this anecdote he acquired a second nickname, Dhu al-Himar (Arabic: ذو الحمار, "the one with the donkey").

When Muhammad became ill after his final pilgrimage to Mecca, Aswad declared himself a prophet. He claimed to receive divine revelation in the form of words, similar to Muhammad, and is recorded to have recited these revelations to his people. Aswad went on to invade Najran and most of Yemen. He attacked Sana'a; Shahr, who was the ruler of Yemen and the son of Badhan, was killed in battle against Aswad. Aswad married Shahr's widow and declared himself ruler of Yemen. After his invasion of Yemen, he changed his title from "Prophet of God" to Rahman of Yemen ("The Merciful for Yemen").

Aswad's rule over Yemen was short-lived as Fayruz al-Daylami, a Persian Muslim, brought an army against Aswad. According to tradition, Aswad was assassinated on the night immediately prior to Muhammad's own death. He was assassinated by Fayruz, with the aid of Qays ibn Abd Yaghuth and Aswad’s wife. After Aswad's death, Yemen would become a part of the Rashidun Caliphate.

== See also ==
- Musaylimah
- Tulayha
- Sajah
- Saf ibn Sayyad
