= Shurahbil ibn Hasana =

Companion of Muhammad and army commander (died 639)

- Died: 639; Amwas
- Relatives: Abd Allah ibn Mu'ta ibn Abdullah Al-Ghawthi (father); Hasana (mother)
- Military career
- Allegiance: Rashidun Caliphate (632–639)
- Conflicts: Ridda wars; Battle of Yamamah (December 632); Muslim conquest of the Levant (634–639); Siege of Bosra (May 634); Battle of Ajnadayn (July 634); Battle of Fahl (January 635); Siege of Baysan; Conquest of northern Palestine (636); Siege of Jerusalem (636–637)

Abū ʿAbd Allāh Shuraḥbīl ibn Ḥasana (Arabic: شُرَحبِيْل بن حَسَنَة) was one of the earliest Muslim converts, a sahabi (companion of the Islamic prophet Muhammad) and a key commander in the Rashidun army during the Muslim conquest of the Levant.

== Early life ==
Shurahbil's father was Abd Allah ibn Mu'ta ibn Abdullah ibn Al-Ghatrif Al-Ghawthi, a member of the Arab tribe of Kinda. Shurahbil was named after his mother Hasana. Through his mother's later marriages, he was connected to the Qurayshite clans of Zuhra and Jumah of Mecca. Shurahbil was an early convert to Islam and is counted among the sahaba (companions) of the Islamic prophet Muhammad. He was part of the second Muslim migration to Abyssinia from Mecca to escape the persecution of the pagan Quraysh.

== Military career ==
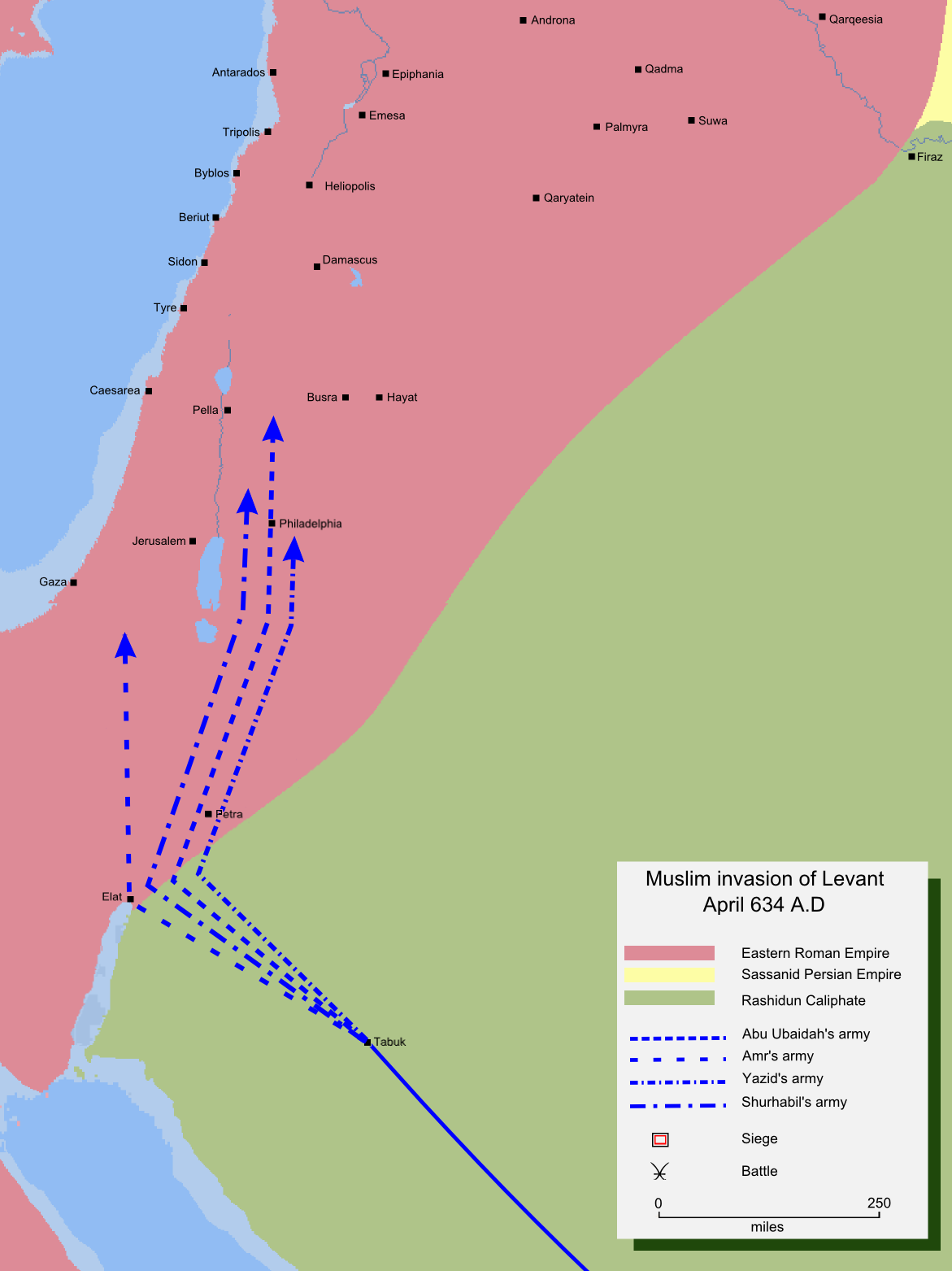
The path of Shurahbil's army in Palestine

=== Battles in Muhammad's lifetime and the Ridda wars ===
Shurahbil later took part in the raids against the pagan Arabs during the lifetime of Muhammad. After Muhammad died in 632, many of the Arab tribes that had embraced Islam left the faith and defected from the embryonic Muslim state. The Ridda Wars were subsequently launched throughout Arabia by the first Rashidun Caliph Abu Bakr (r. 632–634) to subdue those tribes. During those wars, Shurahbil fought on the Muslim side as a deputy commander of Khalid ibn al-Walid in the campaign in Aqraba or al-Yamama in the central Najd.

=== Conquest of the Levant ===
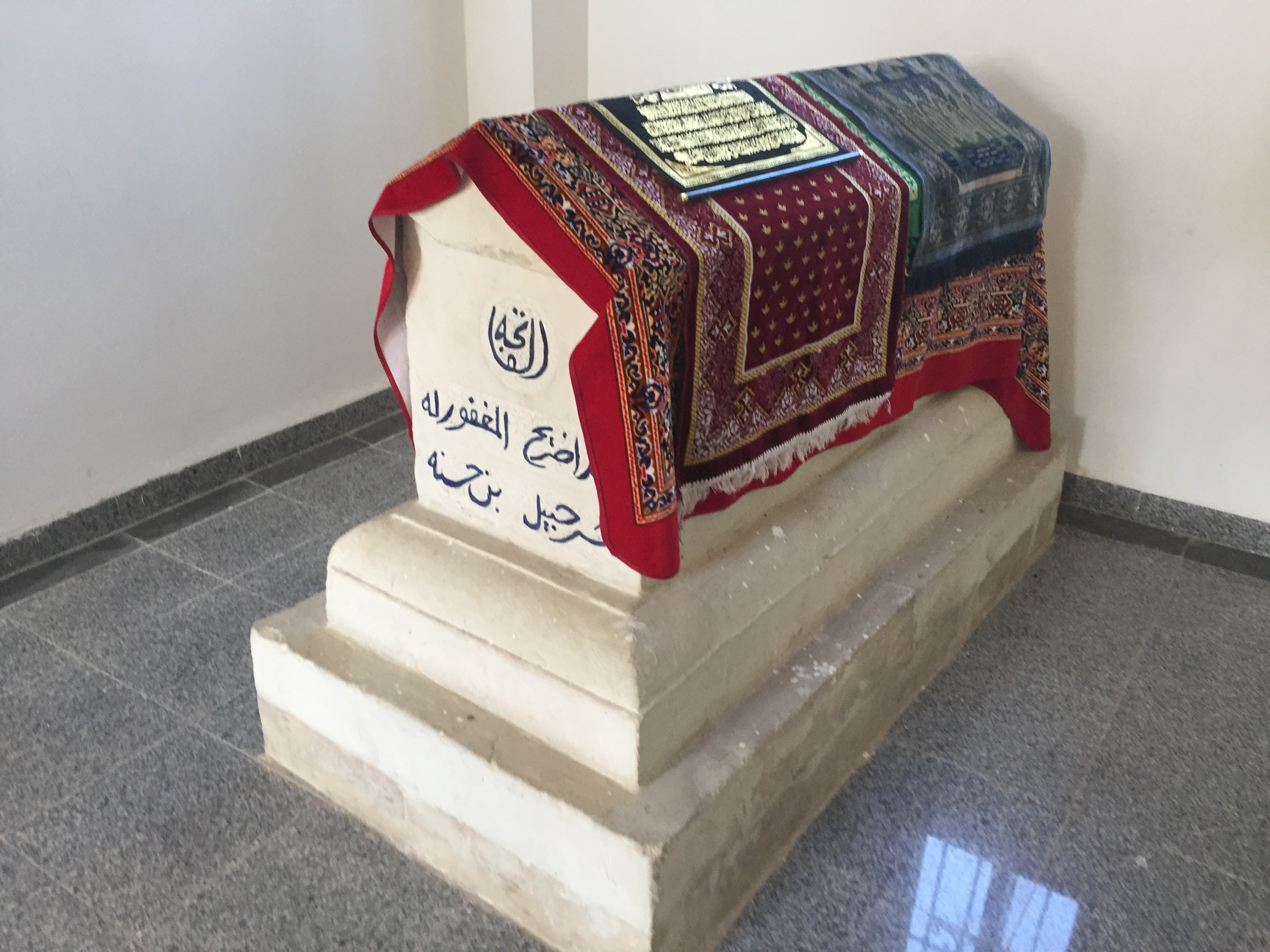
Shrine of Shurahbil ibn Hasana, Jordan

After the Muslim victory in the Ridda wars, Shurahbil was appointed a commander of one of the four Muslim armies dispatched to conquer the Levant from the Byzantine Empire and its Arab Christian allies. Shurahbil's army was 7,000-strong and its zone of operations corresponded to the territory of Palaestina Secunda. There are scant details about Shurahbil's campaigns. His initial assignment was to the region that corresponds with modern-day southern Jordan possibly to keep in check the Quda'a tribes which had embraced, broken and reconciled with the nascent Muslim state based in Medina in the previous years. According to the 8th-century histories of Ibn Ishaq and al-Waqidi, Shurahbil was present during the siege of Bosra, led by Khalid ibn al-Walid in May 634. It was the first major Syrian city to be conquered by the Muslims.

Later, in July, Shurahbil served as a deputy of Amr ibn al-As in the decisive victory against the Byzantines at the Battle of Ajnadayn, which also saw significant Muslim losses, between Ramla and Bayt Jibrin. The Muslims apparently pursued the Byzantines northward and defeated them at the Battle of Fahl in December 634/January 635 where Shurahbil was again a deputy commander. According to 8th-century historian Sayf ibn Umar, Abu Ubayda ibn al-Jarrah left Shurahbil and Amr in charge of Fahl (Pella) and they proceeded to besiege Baysan which ultimately surrendered after minor clashes over the course of several days. Shurahbil likely played a commanding role in the Muslim capture of Gerasa (Jerash) and the Golan region between late 634 and early 635 as well.

After the Byzantine army under Emperor Heraclius was routed at the Battle of the Yarmouk, Shurahbil was put in charge of the conquest of northern Palestine. He achieved this with the exception of Caesarea, which was later captured by other Muslim generals after a siege of several years.

== Personal life ==
Shurahbil ibn Hasana married the daughter of Al-Shifa bint Abdullah.

== Death ==
Shurahbil died in 639 in the Plague of Amwas in central Palestine along with another of the four main Muslim commanders, Yazid ibn Abi Sufyan. According to the 9th-century historian al-Baladhuri, he was aged 69, while the 13th-century historian Ibn al-Athir wrote that he died at age 67.

== See also ==
- 7th century in Lebanon § Ṣaḥāba who have visited Lebanon

== Bibliography ==
- Bosworth, C. E. (1997). "Shuraḥbīl b. Ḥaṣana". In Bosworth, C. E.; van Donzel, E.; Heinrichs, W. P. & Lecomte, G. (eds.). The Encyclopaedia of Islam, Second Edition. Volume IX: San–Sze. Leiden: E. J. Brill. ISBN 978-90-04-10422-8.
- Donner, Fred M. (1981). The Early Islamic Conquests. Princeton: Princeton University Press. ISBN 978-1-4008-4787-7.
- Perlman, Yaara (April 2020). "The Tribal Affiliations of Shuraḥbīl ibn Ḥasana". Journal of Near Eastern Studies. 79 (1): 113–124. doi:10.1086/707614. S2CID 216474831.
