= Battle of Zafar =

632 battle

Coordinates: 14°12′41″N 44°24′12″E

- Part of Ridda wars and Campaigns of Khalid ibn al-Walid
| Date | October 632 |
| Location | Zafar, Ha'il, Arabia |
| Result | Rashidun Caliphate victory |

Belligerents
| Rashidun Caliphate | Apostate rebels |

Commanders and leaders
| Abu Bakr; Khalid ibn al-Walid | Salma (Umm Zhiml) † |

Strength
| Unknown | Unknown |

Casualties and losses
| Negligible | Heavy |

The Battle of Zafar took place in 632 between Khalid ibn al-Walid, a companion of the Islamic prophet Muhammad, and a tribal chieftess called Salma. Khalid defeated her and she died on the battlefield. The battle was part of the Ridda Wars.

The apostate leader was riding on a camel, surrounded by her loyal bodyguards.

In third week of October 632 CE Khalid ibn al-Walid approached her with a group of mujahideen and slaughtered her and her bodyguards. Several hundred apostates died in this battle.
