= Al-Yamama =

Historical region in south-eastern Najd, Saudi Arabia

Coordinates: 24.1483°N 47.3050°E

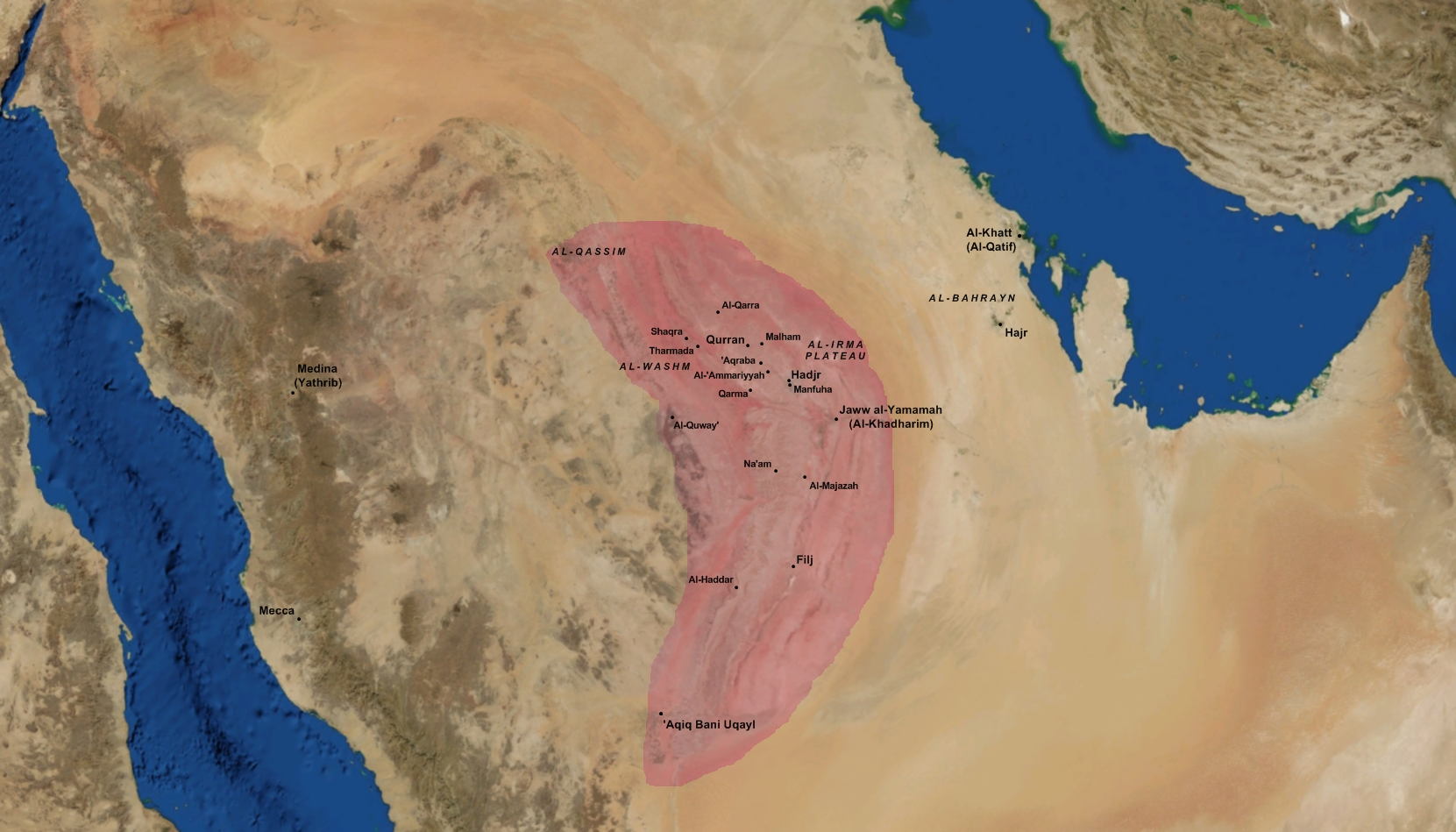
The historical region of Al-Yamamah at its greatest extent, as described by Yaqut (13th century) and Al-Hamadani (10th century), along with some of the region's prominent settlements in pre-Islamic and early Islamic times

Al-Yamama (Arabic: اليَمامَة, romanized: al-Yamāma) is a historical region in south-eastern Najd in modern-day Saudi Arabia.

Only a handful of centralized states ever arose in the Yamama, but it figured prominently in early Islamic history, becoming a central theater in the Ridda wars immediately following Muhammad's death. Despite being incorporated into the Najd region, the term 'al-Yamama' remains in use as a traditional and historical term to reference or emphasize the region's ancient past. The current headquarters of the Saudi government in Riyadh, for example, is known as the Palace of Yamamah.

== Etymology ==
The 13th-century geographer Yaqut al-Hamawi mentions a number of etymologies for al-Yamama, including the root word hamam (Arabic for "domesticated pigeon") but the historian G. Rex Smith considers them unlikely. Instead, Smith holds that it is more likely the name al-Yamama is the singular form of the Arabic word for wild pigeons, yamam.

== History ==
From the pre-Islamic period through the early centuries of Islam, the Yamama was an important agricultural production center for Arabia. It was counted as part of the Najd, the central Arabian plateau, and its principal town was historically Hajar. It was especially noted among the people of Arabia for the quality and abundance of its dates, wheat and meats. It historically provided for the wheat needs of Mecca's inhabitants. The predominant tribe of the Yamama was the Banu Hanifa, who lived a settled, largely agricultural existence. The Hanifa of the Yamama also supplied skilled laborers who found work in Mecca; the Islamic prophet Muhammad is known to have employed them for the production of clay used to build his mosque in Medina and held high opinions of the Hanafi workers.

=== Period of Musaylima and Muslim conquest ===
During the lifetime of Muhammad, the major political figure of the Yamama was Hawdha ibn Ali, whose influence spanned central and northern Arabia. After his death, another tribesman of the Hanifa, Musaylima, came to dominate the Yamama's politics. He had already been a kahin (soothsayer) and proclaimed himself a prophet and messenger in his native village of Haddar, located in the Yamama valley of Falj, before Muhammad had embarked on the Hijrah (emigration from Mecca to Medina, a momentous event in Muhammad's life which marked the start of the Islamic calendar) in c. 622. Another Hanafite tribesman, Thumama ibn Uthal, who had been captured by the Muslims as a result of his attack against Muhammad's emissary to the communities of Bahrayn (eastern Arabia), al-Ala al-Hadhrami, converted to Islam after being released from captivity. He returned to the Yamama where he led a garrison of Muslim fighters and stood as the principal opposition to Musaylima. Around 631, he was appointed by Muhammad as the Yamama's governor, though most of the region remained outside of Muslim control, only small numbers of the region's people having embraced Islam, while the rest was under the sway of Musaylima.

Musaylima forged a socio-religious order in the Yamama based on his claims to prophethood in the last years before Muhammad's death in 632. In addition to his Hanifa tribesmen, he gained followers from the Banu Usayyid, a small branch of the Tamim tribe, which was present throughout northeastern Arabia. The Usayyid immigrants were settled in small agricultural hamlets and were charged with guarding the Yamama's haram (sacred space), which Musaylima had organized. Muhammad's death boosted the fortunes of Musaylima, who gained more followers, authority and prestige in the Yamama. The Muslims had chosen as Muhammad's political successor Abu Bakr, who ruled from the Islamic prophet's seat in Medina. Abu Bakr aimed to extend or consolidate Muslim rule over Arabia and appointed Ikrima ibn Abi Jahl and Shurahbil ibn Hasana at the head a Muslim force to reinforce Musaylima's nearest enemy, Thumama, in the Yamama. At the same time, a self-proclaimed prophetess of the Tamim and opponent of the Muslims, Sajah, gained a substantial following among her tribesmen and targeted the Yamama. Musaylima allied with her.

Ikrima's attacks against the Hanifa in the Yamama were beaten back by Musaylima's followers and he withdrew from the region, while Shurahbil was ordered by Abu Bakr to stay to support Thumama until the arrival of a larger army led by Khalid ibn al-Walid. Khalid was dispatched by Abu Bakr with dire warnings of the Hanifa's military prowess and orders to severely punish the tribe in the event of a victory against them. Khalid's army was defeated in its first three engagements against Musaylima's warriors at the Battle of Aqraba, but defeated them in the fourth encounter, during which their field commander was slain. This prompted the flight of the Hanifa tribesmen, to an enclosed garden where they fought a last stand against the Muslims. The Hanifa in the garden were routed, nearly all of them being slain, including Musaylima.

Despite orders to treat the surviving Hanafite tribesmen harshly, Khalid entered a treaty with them, using one of their own who had converted to Islam, Mujja'a ibn Murara, as his intermediary with the tribe. The Hanifa agreed to embrace Islam in return for surrendering their gold, silver, weapons and armor to the Muslims, an agreement which Abu Bakr sanctioned. The conquest of the Yamama enabled the Muslims to extend their control to the neighboring regions of Arabia, namely Bahrayn and Oman. Though the Muslim traditional sources indicate the wholesale conversion of the Yamama's inhabitants, the historian Al Makin argues followers of Musaylima continued to agitate against centralized rule and for regional autonomy, which fueled their support for dissident religious movements.

=== Najdat Kharijite revolt ===
During the Second Muslim Civil War (680–692), the Yamama became the center of the Najdat, one of the two major Kharijite movements opposed to the all the war's main parties, i.e. the Umayyads, Zubayrids and Alids. The Kharijites of the Yamama originally chose the Hanafite tribesman Abu Talut Salim ibn Matar as their leader and in 684 he led their capture of the vast Umayyad estate of Jawn al-Khadarim, where he divided the plunder and slaves once employed by Caliph Mu'awiya I (r. 661–680) among his men and set up headquarters. The following year the Yamama Kharijites elected as their leader the Hanafite Najda, after whom the movement was known. Over the next few years Najda led the Yamama Kharijites in a string of victories against the tribes and Zubayrid governors of Arabia and formed alliances with other tribes, extending his control to Bahrayn, Oman, Hadramawt, Yemen and the towns of Ta'if and Tabalah. Divisions among his partisans culminated with Najda's assassination by his deputy Abu Fudayk in 691 or 692. By then their territory was limited to the Yamama and Bahrayn. Abu Fudayk defeated an Umayyad expedition against him that year, but was defeated and slain in 692 or 693 in a second expedition. This marked the end of the Najdat emirate.

=== Later Islamic history ===
The 10th-century geographer al-Hamdani noted that the Yamama spanned several isolated fortresses, palm groves and gardens, as well as silver and gold mines. Hajar continued to be its chief settlement, the seat of its governor or emir, and contained a market that had been established centuries before. He lists another settlement of the Yamama, al-Kharj, which an earlier geographer, Ibn Khurradadhbih, called a way-station. The 11th-century geographer Nasir Khusraw also mentions its substantial palm groves. He noted that emirs who followed the Zaydi Shia madhhab ruled the Yamama at that time, and had been its rulers from long before. With their 300 to 400 horsemen, they were able to defend their realm from the neighboring powers.

=== Modern era ===
By the 19th century, 'al-Yamama' came to refer to a town in the region located in the area of al-Kharj, about 70 kilometres (43 mi) southeast of modern Riyadh. It had about 6,000 inhabitants in 1865.

== See also ==
- Riyadh, The capital of Saudi Arabia today, one of the towns of Al-Yamamah
- Qassim, the region of Yamama bordering Najd to the east
- Al-Washm, a subregion of the Yamama

== Bibliography ==
- Kister, M. J. (2002). "The Struggle against Musaylima and the Conquest of Yamama". Jerusalem Studies in Arabic and Islam. 27: 1–56.
- Makin, Al (July 2013). "From Musaylima to the Kharijite Najdiyya". Al-Jami'ah. 51 (1).
- Rubinacci, R (1993). "Nadjadāt". In Bosworth, C. E.; van Donzel, E.; Heinrichs, W. P. & Pellat, Ch. (eds.). The Encyclopaedia of Islam, Second Edition. Volume VII: Mif–Naz. Leiden: E. J. Brill. pp. 858–859. ISBN 978-90-04-09419-2.
- Smith, G. R. (2002). "Al-Yamama". In Bearman, P. J.; Bianquis, Th.; Bosworth, C. E.; van Donzel, E. & Heinrichs, W. P. (eds.). The Encyclopaedia of Islam, Second Edition. Volume XI: W–Z. Leiden: E. J. Brill. p. 269. ISBN 978-90-04-12756-2.
