= Fayruz al-Daylami =

Persian companion of Muhammad

Abū ʿAbd Allāh Fayrūz al-Daylamī al-Himyarī (Arabic: ابو عبدالله فيروز الديلمي, Persian: فیروز دیلمی, Firuz the Daylamite) was an iranian companion of the Islamic prophet Muhammad.

== Biography ==
Fayruz al-Daylami, also spelt Firuz al-Daylami, belonged to the descendants (abna') of the Iranians who had been sent by Khosrow I to Yemen, conquered it, and drove out the Abyssinians. It is stated that a delegation including Fayruz came to Medina from Yemen in 631 and embraced Islam. He had two wives who were sisters. As a result of his conversion to Islam, he divorced one wife on the order of the Islamic prophet Muhammad, since a Muslim cannot simultaneously have as wives two women who are biological sisters.

Later, in 632, after Aswad Ansi claimed prophethood in Yemen and proceeded to invade Najran and much of Yemen—attacking Sanaa and killing the ruler of Yemen, Shahr, son of Badhan—Fayruz was sent by Muhammad to kill Aswad. In al-Tabari's History, Muhammad is reported as saying, "He was killed by the virtuous man Fayruz al-Daylami."

Fayruz died during the reign of the third caliph Uthman (644–656). However, some sources mention that he governed the region of Sanaa and died later, in 673, during the reign of Mu'awiya I.

== See also ==
- List of non-Arab Sahabah
