= Ridda Wars =

Series of military campaigns launched by Abu Bakr against rebel Arab tribes

Ridda Wars حُرُوب ٱلرِّدَّة
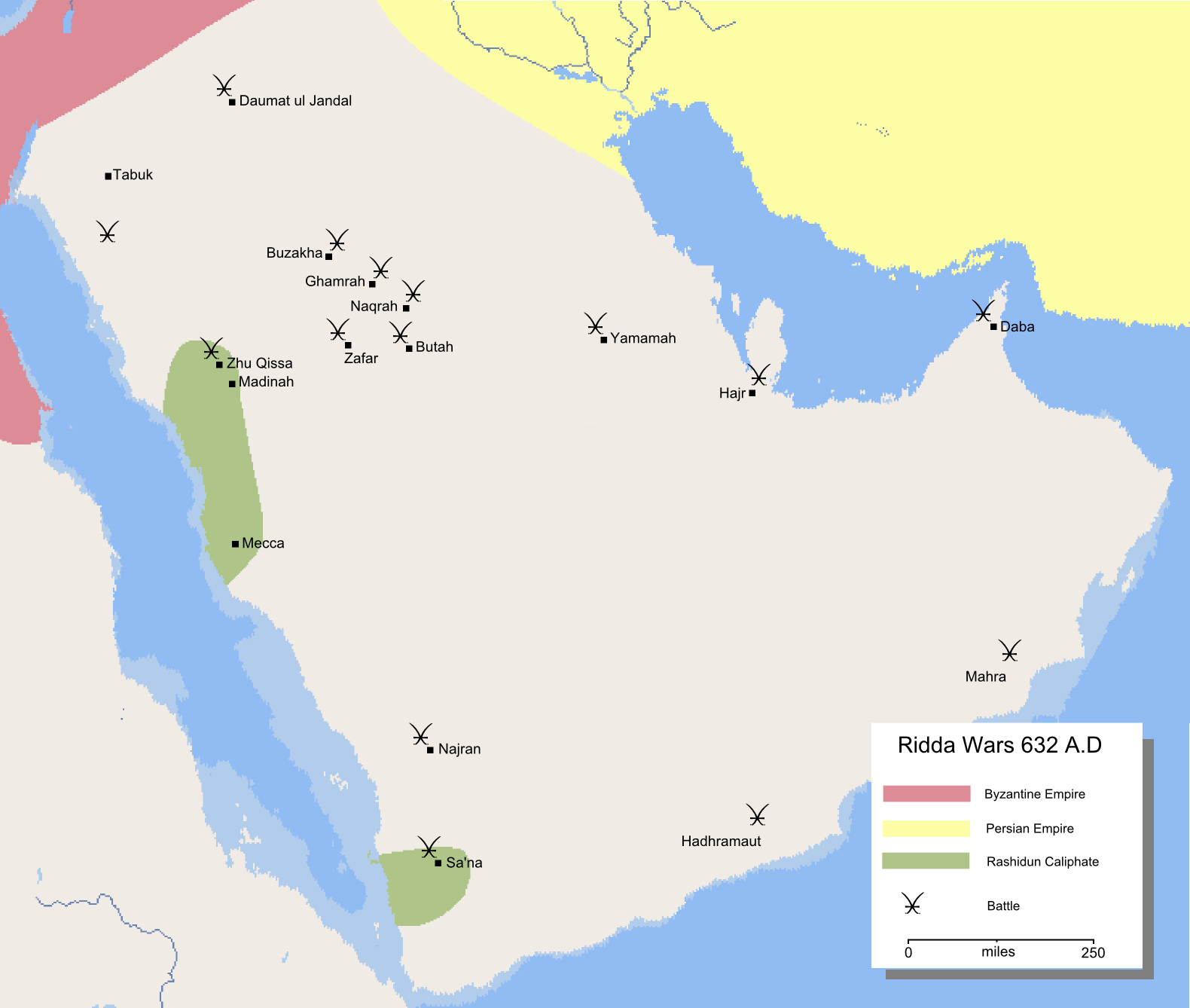
- Map of the major battles of the Ridda Wars
| Date | 632–633 |
| Location | Arabian Peninsula |
| Result | Rashidun victory |
| Territorial changes | Annexation of Arabia by the Rashidun Caliphate |

Belligerents
| Rashidun Caliphate | Rebel Arab tribes |

Commanders and leaders
| Abu Bakr; Khalid ibn al-Walid; Umar ibn al-Khattab; Ikrima ibn Amr; Shurahbil ibn Hasana; Al-Muhajir ibn Abi Umayya; Al-Ala'a Al-Hadrami; Dhiraar ibn al-Azwar; Zayd ibn al-Khattab †; Amr ibn al-As; Al-Nu'man ibn Muqrin; Ali ibn Abi Talib; Zubayr ibn al-Awwam; Khalid ibn Sa'id; Arfaja al-Bariqi; Hudhayfah al-Bariqi; Fayruz al-Daylami | Musaylima †; Tulayha; Aswad Ansi †; Malik ibn Nuwayra (executed); Sajah (surrendered); Umm Ziml Salma †; Laqith ibn Malik al-Azdi †; Al-Ash'ath ibn Qays (surrendered); Ghayth ibn Abd Yaghuth; Qays ibn Makshuh (surrendered); Amr ibn Ma'adi Yakrib (surrendered) |

The Ridda Wars (Note: Arabic: حُرُوب الرِّدَّة, romanized: ḥurūb ar-riddah, lit. 'Apostasy wars') were a series of military campaigns launched by the first Rashidun caliph Abu Bakr against rebellious Arabian tribes, some of which were led by rival prophethood claimants. These wars began shortly after the death of the Islamic prophet Muhammad in 632 and concluded the next year, with all battles won by the Rashidun Caliphate.

In September 632, Laqit, the leader of the Banu Azd tribe, prepared an army to attack Oman. However, commander Hudayfa's forces defeated Laqit and his rebel army. The next month, more rebel attacks were faced in northern Arabia and Yemen, which were also defeated. A few months later, Banu Hanifa's chief Musaylimah, a rival claimant of prophethood with an army of allegedly 40,000 soldiers, was killed in the Battle of Yamama. The last major rebel attack came from the tribe of Kinda in Hadhramaut in January 633. The campaigns came to an end in June 633 as Abu Bakr united all tribes of Arabia.

These wars established Khalid ibn al-Walid's reputation as a great tactician and cavalry commander. A detailed reconstruction of the events is complicated by the frequently contradictory and tendentious accounts found in primary sources.

== Background ==
In May 632, Muhammad ordered a large expedition to be prepared against the Byzantine Empire in order to avenge the martyrs of the Battle of Mu'tah. He appointed Usama ibn Zayd, the son of Zayd ibn Harithah who was killed in the Battle at Mu'tah, as commander of this force so he could avenge the death of his father. However, as Muhammad was ailing, the expedition was delayed. In June 632, Muhammad died and Abu Bakr was chosen as the caliph at Saqifah.

On the first day of his caliphate, Abu Bakr ordered the army of Usama to prepare to march into battle. Abu Bakr was under great pressure regarding this military expedition due to rising rebellions, with many regions across Arabia withholding zakat and leaving Islam. Before his march into battle, Usama sent Umar to Abu Bakr and is reported to have said:

Go to the Caliph, ask him to permit the army to remain at Medina. All the leaders of the community are with me. If we go, none will be left to prevent the infidels from tearing Medina to pieces.

Abu Bakr however refused his demands. On June 26, 632, the army of Usama broke camp and moved out. After leaving Medina, Usama marched to Tabuk where most of the tribes in the region opposed him fiercely, but were defeated. Usama raided far and wide in the region of Northern Arabia, starting with the Quza'a, and then made his way to Dawmatu l-Jandal (modern Al Jawf, Saudi Arabia). Usama next marched to Mu'tah, attacked the Christian Arabs of the tribes of Banu Kalb and the Ghassanids in a small battle. Then he returned to Medina, bringing with him a large number of captives and a considerable amount of wealth, part of which comprised the spoils of war and part taxation of the re-conquered tribes. The Islamic army remained outside of Medina for 40 days. This expedition became notable in Islamic history as the eighteen year old Usama had been appointed as overall commander, leading veterans and high ranked Companions of the Prophet such as Umar, Sa'd ibn Abi Waqqas, Sa'id ibn Zayd, Abu Ubayda ibn al-Jarrah, and Qatada ibn al-Nu'man. (Note: Recorded by Ibn al-Jawzi his Talqīḥ fuhūm ahl al-athar fī ʻuyūn al-tārīkh wa-al-siyar and Nur ad-Din al-Halabi in his Al sirah al halabiyah Juz 2 : The biography of al-'amin al-ma'mun recorded that Sa'd was instead followed the Expedition of Usama bin Zayd along with Umar, Sa'id ibn Zayd, Abu Ubayda ibn al-Jarrah, and Qatada ibn al-Nu'man during this moment.)

Usama's expedition succeeded in forcing several rebel tribes to resubmit to Medinan rule and rejoin Islam. The Quza'a remained rebellious and unrepentant, but 'Amr ibn al-'As later attacked them and forced them to surrender again.

Meanwhile, the rebels of the Ghatafan clan from Qays's tribe made several attempts to capture Mecca, which was still loyal to Islam, before joining the rebel from the north, Tulayha of the Banu Asad, who was seen by many as a rival prophet claimant to Muhammad.

== Ridda Campaign ==
In the fourth week of August 632, Abu Bakr moved to Zhu Qissa with all available fighting forces. There he planned his strategy, in what would later be called the Campaign of Apostasy, to deal with the various rebel groups across Arabia. The battles which he had fought recently against the rebel concentrations at Zhu Qissa and Abraq were, according to tradition, defensive actions to protect Medina and discourage further offensives by the enemy. These actions enabled Abu Bakr to secure a base from which he could fight the major campaign that lay ahead, thus gaining time for the preparation and launching of his main forces.

Abu Bakr had to fight not one but several opponents: Tulayha ibn Khuwaylid ibn Nawfal al-Asadi at Buzakha, Malik bin Nuwaira at Butah, and Musaylima at Yamamah. He had to deal with widespread renouncement of Islam on the eastern and southern coasts of Arabia: in Bahrain, in Oman, in Mahra, in Hadhramaut and in Yemen. There were similar movements renouncing Islam in the regions south and east of Mecca and by the Quza'a in northern Arabia.

Abu Bakr formed the army into several corps, the strongest of which was commanded by Khalid ibn Walid and assigned to fight the most powerful of the rebel forces. Other corps were given areas of secondary importance in which to subdue the less dangerous rebel tribes, and were dispatched after Khalid, according to the outcome of his operations. Abu Bakr's plan was first to clear west-central Arabia (the area nearest to Medina), then tackle Malik bin Nuwaira, and finally concentrate against his most dangerous and powerful enemy: Musaylima, leader of the Banu Hanifa tribe and rival prophet claimant to Muhammad.

=== Battle of Dhu al-Qassah ===
In July 632, Abu Bakr sent envoys to the enemy tribes, calling upon them to remain loyal to Islam and continue to pay their zakat. This demand was rejected by the rebel tribes. Tulayha, who was also acknowledged as a prophet by many Arabian tribes, reinforced an army at Zhu Qissa, a city about thirty miles east of Medina. From there, Tulayha and his forces were preparing to launch an attack on Medina.

Abu Bakr received intelligence of the rebel movements, and immediately prepared for the defence of Medina. Ibn Kathir recorded that Abu Bakr immediately formed organised elite guard units al-Ḥaras wa al-Shurṭa to defend Medina. Veteran companions like Ali ibn Abi Talib, Talha ibn Ubayd Allah and Zubayr ibn al-Awwam were appointed as commanders of these units. The Haras wa'l Shurta troops rode their camels to the mountain passes of Medina at night, intercepting the rebel coalition assault forces, until the enemy retreated to Dhu Qisha.

On 4 August 632, Usama's army returned to Medina. Abu Bakr ordered Usama to rest and resupply his men there for future operations. Meanwhile, in the second week of August 632, Abu Bakr moved his army to Zhu Qissa. The following day, Abu Bakr marched the garrison troops from Medina with the main army and moved towards Dhu Hussa.

Since all horses and trained camels were brought by main army to Balqa, tradition has it that Abu Bakr and the rest of the Haras forces that were left in the capital had to resort to fighting the rebels with only untrained camels. As the rebels retreated to the foothills on the outskirts of the city, Abu Bakr and the Medinan army could not catch up to the battle in the outskirts of Medina due to their untrained camels, so they had to wait until the next day to gather momentum for the second strike. These pack camels, being untrained for battle, bolted when Hibal, the rebel commander at Zhu Hussa, made a surprise attack from the hills; as a result, the Muslims could not control their untrained camels and decided to retreat toward Medina, and the rebels recaptured the outposts that they lost a few days earlier. The Medinans then regrouped their forces to prepare to engage the rebels in the Battle of Zhu Qissa the next day. Abu Bakr merged An-Numan ibn Muqarrin's remaining forces with his own, with Abu Bakr leading from the center, while Al-Nu'man ibn Muqrin rode on the right flank, Abdullah ibn Muqrin on the left flank, and Suwaid ibn Muqrin was positioned in the rear. The surprise attack from the Medinans caused chaos among the rebel forces, and during the height of the battle, Ukasha ibn al-Mihsan managed to kill the rebel leader Hibal, the brother of Tulayha. The Medinan forces finally capturing Dhu Qissa on 1 August 632.

=== Battle of Abraq ===
The defeated rebel tribes retreated to Abraq, where more clansmen of the Ghatfan, the Hawazin, and the Tayy were gathered. Abu Bakr left a residual force under the command of An-Numan ibn Muqarrin at Dhu Qissa and returned with his main army to Medina. The remaining rebels retreated to Buzakha, where rival prophet claimant Tulayha had moved with his army from Samira. Then, after the rebels retreated from the outskirts of Medina, the caliph went further to the north to crush another Bedouin rebellion in Dumat al-Jandal.

In mid-August of the year 632, Battle of Abraq occurred at the Abraq area, situated approximately 8 kilometres (5.0 miles) north of Al Hinakiyah. It is within the Nejd region against rebellious Arab tribes led by Hibal ibn Khuwailid. In response to the rebels retreating into Abraq, Abu Bakr As-Siddiq personally led a corps to Al-Rabadha where he met the rebels from Banu Dhubyan, Banu Bakr ibn Abd Manat, and May others. There, they clashed at al-Abraq. Al-Harith ibn Fulan, a member of the Banu Subay', and Awf ibn Fulan ibn Sinan were killed in the fighting, while Al-Hutay'ah was taken prisoner. After the battle, Abu Bakr stayed in Abraq for a few days. The Banu Dhubyan, who dominated the region. Abraq was then reserved for the horses of the Muslims, while the rest of the land in Al-Rabadha was turned into communal pasture area.

=== Battle of Buzakha ===
As soon as the expedition of Usama ibn Zayd had returned, Abu Bakr immediately started preparing his forces for further combat against the rebels close to Medina. Before dispatching Khalid against Tulayha, Abu Bakr sought to reduce the latter's strength. Nothing could be done about the tribes of Bani Assad and Banu Ghatafan, which stood solidly behind rival prophet claimant Tulayha, but the Tayy were not so staunch in their support of Tulayha, and their chief, Adi ibn Hatim, was a devout Muslim. Adi was appointed by Abu Bakr to negotiate with the tribal elders to withdraw their contingent from Tulayha's army. The negotiations were a success, and Adi brought with him 500 horsemen of his tribe to reinforce Khalid's army. Khalid next marched against another rebel tribe, Jadila. Here again Adi ibn Hatim offered his services to persuade the tribe to submit without bloodshed. Bani Jadila submitted, and their 1000 warriors joined Khalid's army.

Khalid, now much stronger than when he had left Zhu Qissa, marched towards Buzakha. There, in mid-September 632 CE, he defeated Tulayha in the Battle of Buzakha. Khalid led a fast column in pursuit of rebel commander Uyaina, who had fled to the south-east with his clan of Bani Fazara and some elements of the Bani Asad led by Uyaina as far as Ghamra, 60 miles away. After several clashes, Islamic tradition has it that Uyaina at this point became disillusioned regarding the prophethood of Tulayha, even though he supposedly remained defiant and unrepentant at the same time. It is alleged that Khalid personally engaged the bodyguards of Uyaina in combat, before he had Uyaina taken as prisoner. The remnants of rival prophet claimant Tulayha's army retreated to Ghamra, 20 miles from Buzakha, and were defeated in the Battle of Ghamra in the third week of September. After the action at Ghamra, Khalid set off for Naqra where certain clans of the Bani Sulaim had gathered to continue the rebellion. As the rest of the rebel tribes surrendered, Khalid moved south from Buzakha, and Naqra in October, with an army now 6,000 strong, he defeated the rebel tribe of Banu Saleem in the Battle of Naqra. In the third week of October, Khalid defeated a tribal chieftess, Salma, in the battle of Zafar. Afterwards he moved to Najd against the rebel tribe of Banu Tamim and their Sheikh Malik ibn Nuwayrah. As part of his campaigns against the resistance of the Banu Tamim tribe, Khalid sent Dhiraar ibn al-Azwar to quell this rebellion. Dhiraar was one of the Arabian chieftains of the Asad clan who had stayed loyal to the Islamic government in Medina by pledging allegiance to the newly appointed caliph, Abu Bakr, Dhiraar showed his loyalty by warning and chastising the conduct of the peoples who rebelled against the caliphate.

=== Caliphate Army Divisions ===
Mobilizations of 11 caliphate divisions to different areas

The caliph distributed the available manpower among 11 main corps, each under its own commander, and bearing its own standard. The available manpower was distributed among these corps, and while some commanders were given immediate missions, others were given missions to be launched later. The commanders and their assigned objectives were:

- Khalid Ibn Walid: Move against Tulaiha bin Khuwailad Al-Asdee (طُلیحة بن خویلد الاسدی) from the Asad Tribe (بنو اسد) at Buzaakhah (بزاخة), then Banu Sulaim .
- Ikrimah ibn Abi-Jahl: Confront Musaylima at Yamamah but not to engage until more forces were built up.
- Amr ibn al-As: The rebel tribes of Quza'a and Wadi'a in the area of Tabuk and Daumat-ul-Jandal.
- Shurahbil ibn Hasana: Follow Ikrimah and await the Caliph's instructions.
- Khalid bin Saeed: Certain rebel tribes on the Syrian frontier.
- Turaifa bin Hajiz: The rebel tribes of Hawazin and Bani Sulaim in the area east of Medina and Mecca.
- Ala bin Al Hadhrami: The rebels in Bahrain.
- Hudhaifa bin Mihsan: The rebels in Oman.
- Arfajah: The rebels in Mahra.
- Muhajir bin Abi Umayyah: The rebels in Yemen, then the Kinda in Hadhramaut.
- Suwaid bin Muqaran: The rebels in the coastal area north of Yemen.

As soon as the organisation of the corps was complete, Khalid marched off, to be followed a little later by Ikrimah and 'Amr ibn al-'As. The other corps were held back by the caliph and dispatched weeks and even months later, according to the progress of Khalid's operations against the hard core of enemy opposition.

Before the various corps left Zhu Qissa, however, envoys were sent by Abu Bakr to all rebel tribes in a final attempt to induce them to submit.

=== Central Arabia ===
Renouncement of and rebellion against Islam in central Arabia was led by Musaylima, a rival prophet claimant, in the fertile region of Yamamah. He was mainly supported by the powerful tribe of Banu Hanifa. At Buzakha in north central Arabia, another rival prophet claimant, Tulayha, a tribal chief of Banu Asad, led the rebellion against Medina aided by the allied tribes of Banu Ghatafan, the Hawazin, and the Tayy.

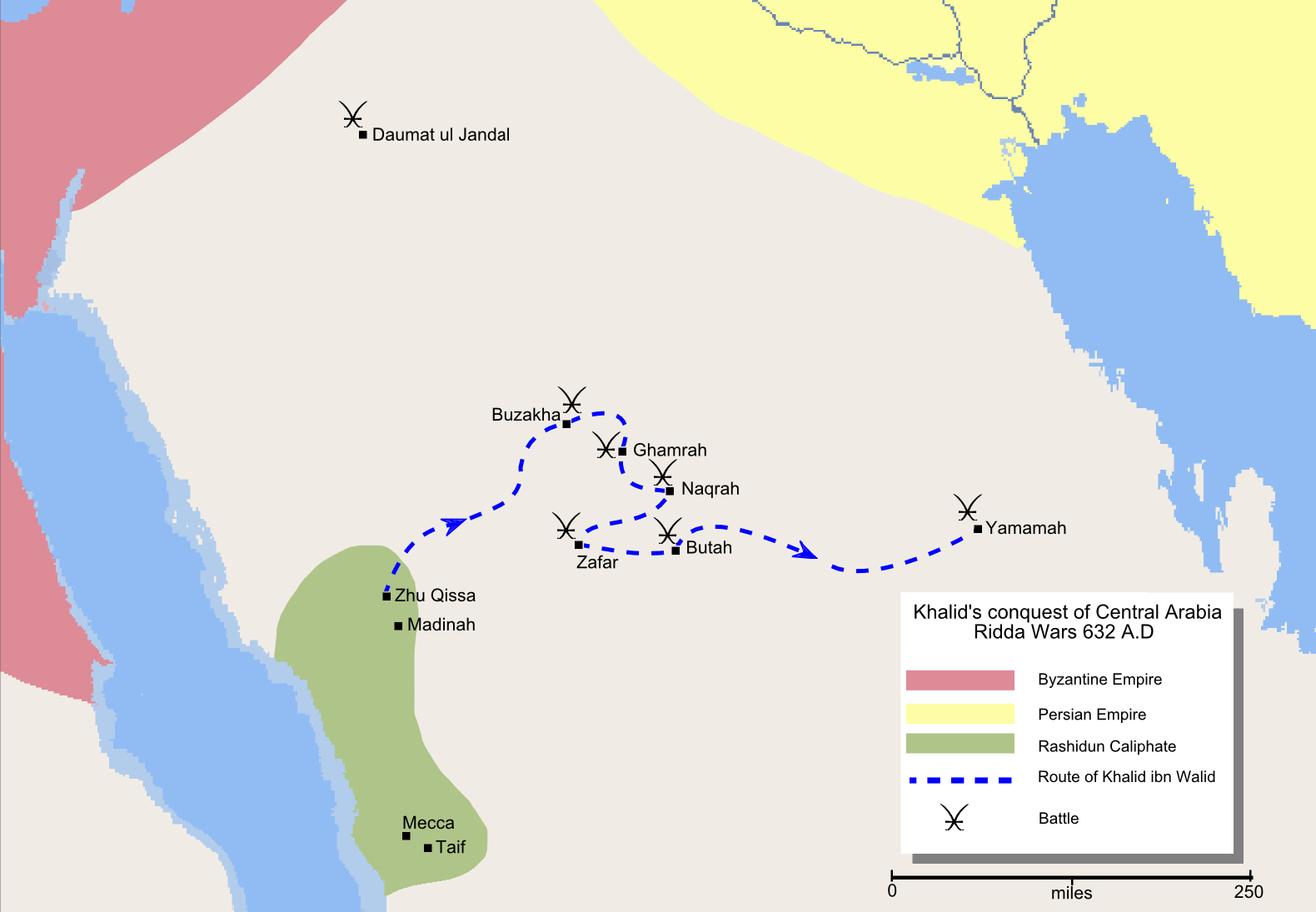
Map detailing the route of Khalid ibn Walid's conquest of Arabia.

Meanwhile, another anti-Medina led by Sajah from Banu Tamim rose up from the north. The situation of Tamim tribe during the life of Sajah was they are the subject of Sasanian Empire. This relationship was established through the Kingdom of Hira. A kingdom that was an extension of Persia in the Arabian Peninsula. Persian traders passed through several regions first to reach Hirah. Bani Tamim played a role in maintaining the security of Persian trade caravans that crossed the Arabian Peninsula. Meanwhile, due to their adherence to Christian religion, the Tamim tribe also develop close relationship with the Christians in the Euphrates region and northern Syria. The Yarbu branch which Sajah hailed from has monopoly in Souk Okaz However, their domination of Souk Okaz came into abrupt end two years before Muhammad preaching Islam. After the death of Muhammad, Sajah self-proclaim herself as one of the prophet. At first, Sajah came into Hizn region, where she manage to gain the allegiance from Bani Malik under Waki' ibn Malik, and Banu Yarbu' under Malik ibn Nuwayra. However, Her proclamation was not entirely successful, as although the Taghlib tribe under Hudhayl ibn 'Imran pledge their allegiance by abandoning Christianity, majority of the Tamim confederation branches rejected her call, which made Sajah gave up hope of getting the support from the majority of her own kinsmen. As the Ridda wars broke out, she moved into al-Yamama, where she joined forces with Musaylima in anti-Medinese coalition. Thereafter, 4,000 people gathered around her to march on Medina. Others joined her against Medina. However, as the time passed on, the alliance between Musaylima and Sajah came into abrupt end as Musaylima grew suspicious towards Sajah. Thus, Sajah left Musaylima's force alone to fought against the Muslim army in al-Yamama.

==== Najd ====
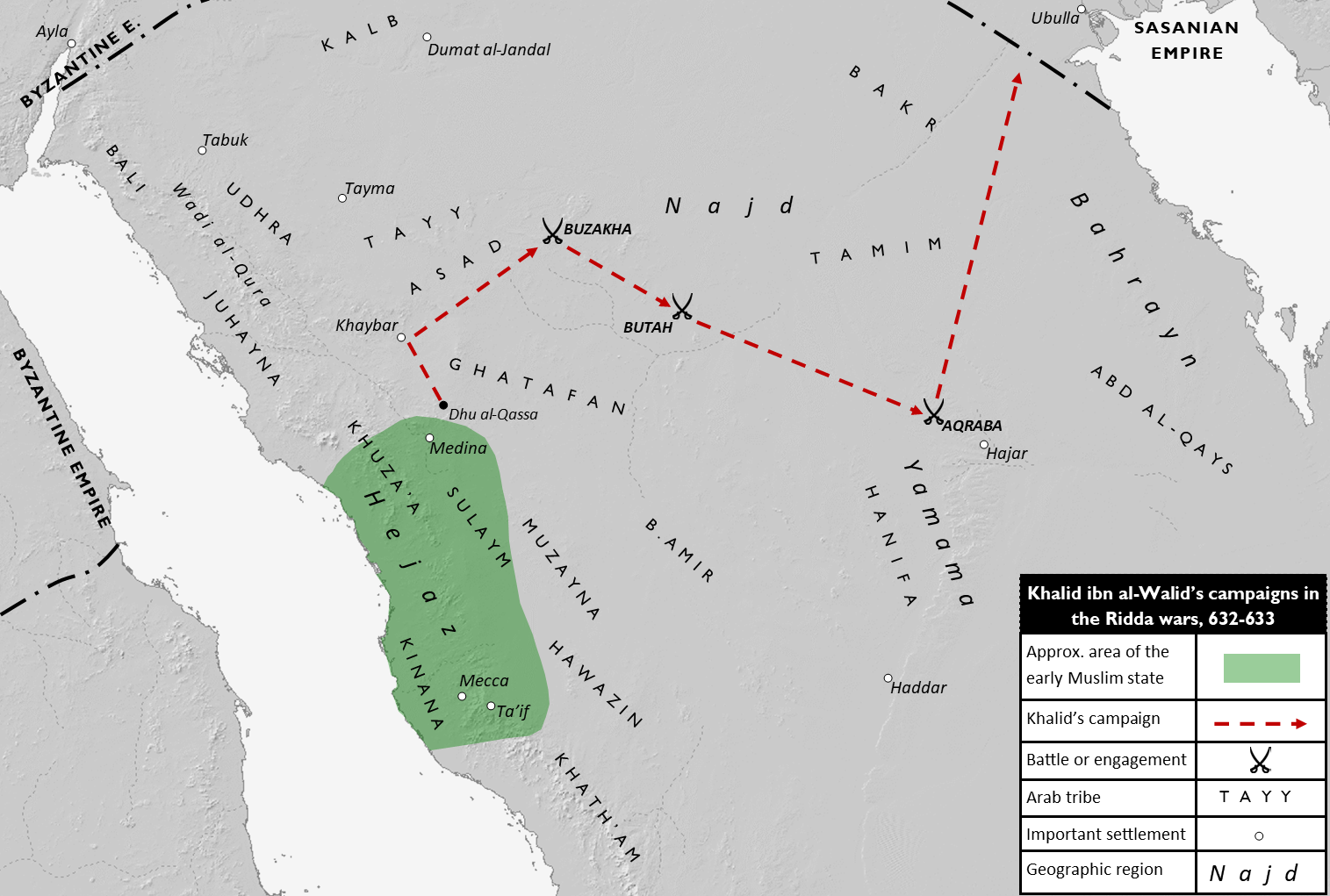
Map of Khalid's campaigns against the Arab tribes of Najd and the Yamama, both in central Arabia, during the Ridda wars. The itinerary of his campaign is indicated by dashed, red arrows. The territory of the early Muslim state, comprising Mecca, Medina and Ta'if and their environs, is shaded in green

At Najd, on learning of Khalid's decisive victories against rebels in Buzakha, many clans of Banu Tamim hastened to visit Khalid, but the Bani Yarbu', a branch of Bani Tamim, under their chief, Malik ibn Nuwayrah, hung back. Malik was a chief of some distinction: a warrior, noted for his generosity, and a famous poet. Bravery, generosity, and poetry were the three qualities most admired among the Arabs.

At the time of Muhammad, he had been appointed as a tax collector for the tribe of Banu Tamim. As soon as Malik heard of the death of Muhammad, he gave back all the tax to his tribespeople, saying, "Now you are the owner of your wealth." Most scholars agreed that he was adhering to the normal beliefs of the Arabs of his time in which they could cease to pledge their allegiance to a tribe upon the death of its Sheikh.

His riders were stopped by Khalid's army at the town of Buttah. Khalid asked them about the pact they signed with the rival prophetess claimant Sajjah; they responded it was merely for revenge against their enemies.

When Khalid reached Najd he found no opposing army. He sent his cavalry to nearby villages and ordered them to call the Azaan (call to prayer) to each party they met. Zirrar bin Azwar, a squadron leader, arrested the family of Malik, claiming they did not answer the call to prayer. Malik avoided direct contact with Khalid's army and ordered his followers to scatter, and he and his family apparently moved away across the desert. He refused to give zakat, differentiating between prayer and zakat.

Nevertheless, Malik was accused of rebellion against the state of Medina. He was also to be charged for his entering into an alliance with Sajjah against the caliphate. Malik was arrested along with those of his clan.

Malik was asked by Khalid about his crimes, and responded, "your master said this, your master said that", referring to Muhammad. Khalid declared Malik a rebel apostate and ordered his execution.

==== Yamamah ====
Ikrimah ibn Abi-Jahl, one of the corps commanders, was instructed to make contact with Musaylima at Yamamah, but not to engage until Khalid joined him. Abu Bakr's intention in giving Ikrimah this mission was to tie Musaylima down at Yamamah, thereby freeing Khalid to deal with the rebel tribes of north-central Arabia without interference.

Meanwhile, Abu Bakr sent Shurhabil's corps to reinforce Ikrimah at Yamamah. Ikrimah, however, in early September 632, attacked Musaylima's forces before the reinforcements arrived, and was defeated. He reported his actions to Abu Bakr, who, both pained and angered by the rashness of Ikrimah and his disobedience, ordered him to proceed with his force to Oman to assist Hudaifa; once Hudaifa had completed his task, he was to march to Mahra to help Arfaja, and thereafter go to Yemen to help Muhajir.

Meanwhile, Abu Bakr sent orders to Khalid to march against Musaylima. Shurhabil's corps, stationed at Yamamah, was to reinforce Khalid's corps. In addition to this, Abu Bakr assembled a fresh army of Ansar and Muhajireen in Medina that joined Khalid's corps at Butah before the combined force set out for Yamamah.

Though Abu Bakr had instructed Shurhabil not to engage Musaylima's forces until Khalid's arrival, Shurhabil engaged Musaylima's forces anyway and was defeated. Khalid linked up with the remnants of Shurhabil's corps early in December 632.

The combined force of Muslims, now 13,000 strong, finally defeated Musaylima's army in the Battle of Yamama, which was fought in the third week of December. The fortified city of Yamamah surrendered peacefully later that week.

Khalid established his headquarters at Yamamah, from which he despatched columns throughout the plain of Aqraba to subdue the region around Yamamah. Thereafter, all of central Arabia submitted to Medina.

What remained of the multiple rebellions in the less vital areas of Arabia was rooted out by the Muslims in a series of well-planned campaigns within five months.

=== Oman ===
In mid-September 632, Abu Bakr dispatched Hudaifa bin Mihsan's corps to tackle the rebellion in Oman, where the dominant tribe of Azd had revolted under their chief Laqit bin Malik, known more commonly as "Dhu'l-Taj" ("the Crowned One"). According to some reports, he also claimed prophethood.

Hudaifa entered Oman, but not having sufficient strength to fight Dhu'l-Taj, he requested reinforcements from the Caliph, who sent Ikrimah from Yamamah to aid him in late September. The combined forces then defeated Dhu'l-Taj at a battle at Dibba, one of Dhu'l-Taj's strongholds, in November. Dhu'l-Taj himself was killed in the battle.

Hudaifa was appointed governor of Oman, and set about the re-establishment of law and order. Ikrimah, having no local administrative responsibility, used his corps to subdue the area around Daba, and, in a number of small actions, succeeded in breaking the resistance of those Azd who had continued to defy the authority of Medina.

=== Northern Arabia ===
Some time in October 632, Amr's corps was dispatched to the Syrian border to subdue the rebel tribes—most importantly, the Quza'a and the Wadi'a (a part of the Bani Kalb)--in the region around Tabuk and Daumat-ul-Jandal (Al-Jawf). Amr was not able to beat the tribes into submission until Shurhabil joined him in January after the Battle of Yamamah.

=== Yemen ===
Yemen had been the first province to rebel against the authority of Islam when the tribe of Ans rose in arms under the leadership of its chief and rival prophet claimant Al-Aswad Al-Ansi, the Black One. Yemen was controlled then by Al-Abna', a group descended from the Sasanian Persian garrison in Sanaa. When Badhan died, his son Shahr partially became governor of Yemen but was killed by Al-Aswad. Al-Aswad was later killed by Fayruz al-Daylami, also an abna' member, who was sent by Muhammad, and thereafter Fairuz acted as governor of Yemen at San'a.

==== Second Rebellion of Yemen ====
In the later phase after the death of Aswad al-Ansi, two Yemenite chieftains, Amr ibn Ma'adi Yakrib and his nephew, Qays ibn Makshuh revolted against Fairuz. At first, Amr and Qays supported the caliphate suppression of Aswad rebellion. However, both Amr and Qays later revolted against the caliphate as both did not agree with new administrator appointed by the caliph, thus they seceded from leadership of Farwah, who acted as their region's governor at the time. Amr and Qays ibn Maksuh then conspired to kill three caliphate deputies in Yemen.

A caliphate commander Al-Muhajir ibn Abi Umayya led the Al-Abna' opposing Qays. Ultimately, the forces of Qays and Amr were defeated by the force of Ikrima ibn Abi Jahl. Amr and Qays were said to be captured by Fayruz al-Daylami. According to the record of Usd al-ghabah fi marifat al-Saḥabah, Amr came to Medina as a prisoner, guarded by a caliphate soldier named Al-Muhajir ibn Abi Umayya. Amr was then brought before Caliph Abu Bakr, who invited him to rejoin Islam, to which Amr agreed. Thus, Amr was pardoned by the caliph.

=== Mahra ===
From Oman, following the orders of Abu Bakr, Ikrimah marched to Mahra to join Arfaja bin Harthama. As Arfaja had not yet arrived, Ikrimah, instead of waiting for him, engaged the local rebels on his own.

At Jairut, Ikrimah met two rebel armies preparing for battle. Here he persuaded the weaker to embrace Islam and then joined up with them to defeat their opponents. Having re-established Islam in Mahra, Ikrimah moved his corps to Abyan, where he rested his men and awaited further developments.

=== Bahrain ===
After the Battle of Yamamah, Abu Bakr sent Ala bin Al Hadhrami's corps against the rebels of Bahrain. Ala arrived in Bahrain to find the rebel forces gathered at Hajr and entrenched in a strong position. Ala mounted a surprise attack one night and captured the city. The rebels retreated to the coastal regions, where they made one more stand but were decisively defeated. Most of them surrendered and reverted to Islam. This operation was completed at about the end of January 633.

=== Hadhramaut ===
The last of the great revolts against Islam was that of the powerful tribe of Kinda, who inhabited the region of Najran, Hadhramaut, and eastern Yemen. They did not revolt until January 633.

Ziyad bin Lubaid, Muslim governor of Hadhramaut, operated against them and raided Riyaz, after which the whole of the Kinda broke into rebellion under al-Ash'ath ibn Qays and prepared for war. However, the strength of the two forces, i.e. the rebel forces and Muslim forces, was so well balanced that neither side felt able to start serious hostilities. Ziyad waited for reinforcements before attacking the rebels.

Al-Ash'ath at first managed to defeat the larger Muslim army, whose ranks included many Kindites from the large Sakun division, at the valley of Zurqan. Afterward, the arrival of further Muslim forces under Ikrima ibn Abi Jahl prompted al-Ash'ath to lead his men and their families to barricade in the fortress of al-Nujayr, where they were besieged by the Muslim forces. Al-Ash'ath secured safe passage for a number of his relatives, but the rest of the besieged fighters were executed. He was spared but taken captive and sent to Caliph Abu Bakr (r. 632–634), who agreed to release him after he repented. He thereafter took up residence in Medina, capital of the caliphate, where he was married to Abu Bakr's sister, Umm Farwa. This was a rare honour, and none of the other leaders of the Ridda wars were similarly treated. As al-Ash'ath's principal wife, Umm Farwa bore him five children, including his oldest son, Muhammad.

Reinforcements were on the way. al-Muhajir ibn Abi Umayya, the last of the corps commanders to be dispatched by Abu Bakr, defeated some rebel tribes in Najran, south-eastern Arabia, and was directed by Abu Bakr to march to Hadhramaut and join Ziyad against the Kinda. The Caliph also instructed Ikrimah, who was at Abyan, to join Ziyad and Muhajir's forces.

In late January 633, the forces of Muhajir and Ziyad combined at Zafar, capital of Hadhramaut, under the overall command of the former, and defeated al-Ash'ath, who retreated to the fortified town of Nujair.

Just after this battle, the corps of Ikrimah also arrived. The three Muslim corps, under the overall command of Muhajir, advanced on Nujair and laid siege to the fortified city.

Nujair was captured some time in mid-February 633. With the defeat of the Kinda at Nujair, the last of the great rebel movements collapsed. Arabia was re-established as predominantly Islamic.

The Campaign of the Apostasy was fought and completed during the 11th year of the Hijra. The year 12 Hijri dawned on March 16, 633, with Arabia united under the central authority of the Caliph at Medina.

== Aftermath ==
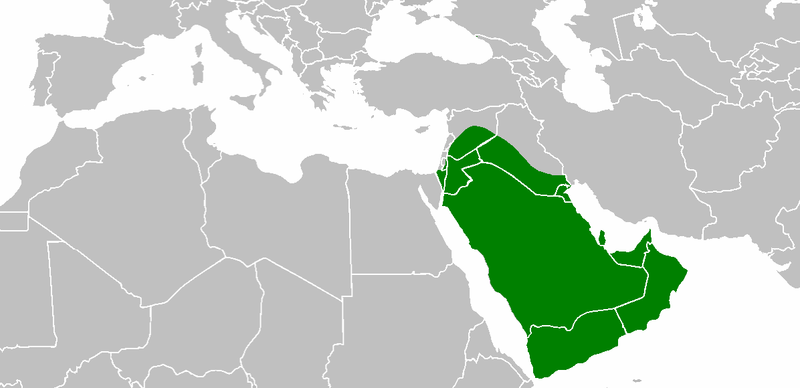
Rashidun Caliphate during the caliphate of Abu Bakr

With the collapse of the rebellions, Abu Bakr gained control of the entire Arabian Peninsula. He decided to expand the caliphate. It is unclear whether his intention was to mount a full-scale expansion, or preemptive attacks to secure a buffer zone between the Islamic state and the powerful Sasanian and Byzantine empires. This set the stage for the Islamic conquest of Persia. Khalid was sent to Persia with an army consisting of 18,000 volunteers, and conquered the richest province of Persia: Iraq. Thereafter, Abu Bakr sent his armies to invade Roman Syria, an important province of the Byzantine Empire.

=== Third rebellion in Yemen ===
At some point during the rule of Umar ibn al-Khattab, the second caliph, the people of Yemen revolted once again under the leadership of a man named Ghayth ibn Abd Yaghuth. The avowed aim of the rebels was to drive the Muslims out of Yemen by assassinating Fairuz and other key Muslim leaders. Fairuz somehow escaped and took shelter in the mountains in June or July 632. For the next six months, Fairuz remained in his stronghold, during which time he was joined by thousands of Yemeni Muslims. When he felt strong enough, Fairuz marched to San'a and defeated Qays, who retreated with his remaining men northeast to Abyan, where they all surrendered and were subsequently pardoned by the caliph. On the other side, Uthman ibn Abi al-As also dispatched a force from Ta'if against rebel clans from the tribes of Azd and Bajila in Yemen. He later also contributed a twenty-man force from the city under the command of his brother to assist Medina's war efforts in Yemen. Abu Bakr kept Uthman in his post as did his successor Caliph Umar.

== See also ==
- Arab–Byzantine wars
- Jahiliyyah
- Pre-Islamic Arabia
- Religion in pre-Islamic Arabia
