= Tulayha ibn Khuwaylid =

7th-century Arab clan chief and military commander

Tulayha

Personal details
- Died: 642 Nahavand
- Parent: Khuwaylid ibn Nawfal al-Asadi

Military service
- Battles/wars: Expedition of Qatan; Battle of the Trench; Battle of Zhu Qissa; Battle of Buzakha; Battle of Ghamra; Battle of al-Qadisiyyah; Battle of Jalula; Battle of Nahavand †

Tulayha ibn Khuwaylid ibn Nawfal al-Asadi (Arabic: طليحة بن خويلد بن نوفل الأسدي) was a wealthy Arab clan chief and military commander during the time of the Islamic prophet Muhammad; he belonged to the Banu Asad ibn Khuzaymah tribe.

In 625 he was defeated in the Expedition of Qatan, a Muslim expedition against him. He also took part in the Battle of the Trench in 627 against Muhammad and in Battle of Buzakha and Battle of Ghamra in 632 against the Rashidun caliphate. He later submitted to the caliphate and participated in the Battle of al-Qadisiyyah, Battle of Jalula, and the Battle of Nahavand on the Muslim side.

He along with Amr ibn Ma'adi Yakrib were praised by Umar for their strength in battlefield and military wisdom during the Muslim conquest of Persia.

== Biography ==
In 631, Tulayha claimed to be a prophet and the recipient of divine revelation and rebelled against Muhammad. Thus, Tulayha became the third person to claim prophethood among the Arabs against Muhammad. Many tribes acknowledged him as a prophet, which made him sufficiently strong and powerful to lead a confederacy of numerous tribes against the Muslims.

Muhammad died in June 632. In July 632, Abu Bakr raised an army mainly from Banu Hashim, a clan within the tribe of Quraysh. Ali ibn Abi Talib, Talha ibn Ubaidullah and Zubair ibn al-Awam, were each appointed as commander of one-third of the newly organized force. They fought the Battle of Zhu Qissa against the forces of Tulayha and his followers as they prepared to launch an attack on Medina during the Ridda wars. The Rashidun commanders held until they were reinforced by Abu Bakr. Tulayha was defeated and his forces were driven back to Zhu Hussa.

Thereafter, Khalid ibn al-Walid was sent to crush him and his confederacy. The armies of Khalid and Tulayha met at a place named Buzakha in 632. In this engagement, the army of Tulayha was defeated in the Battle of Buzakha. Following this battle, many of the rebellious tribes surrendered and converted to Islam. However, Tulayha escaped from Buzakha and sought refuge in Syria. But when Syria was conquered by the Muslims, Tulayha converted to Islam.

In 634, he personally paid homage to Umar after the latter’s assumption of the position of Caliph. Later on, Tulayha enthusiastically took part in the campaign against the Sassanid Empire in the Battle of Jalula, the Battle of al-Qādisiyyah, and the Battle of Nahavand.

== Battle of al-Qādisiyyah ==
The Tabari chronicle records that Tulayha played a significant role in the famous battle of al-Qādisiyyah. The translation from Arabic language by Andrew Leber mentions the contingent of Bani Assad, the clan of Tulayha, played a significant role on the Yaum Armath (يوم أرماث) or "The Day of Disorder".

At one time it is recorded that he single-handedly rushed enemy ranks in the dark of night and came back with a prisoner of war, Tabari particularly detailed in one chain of narrations the circumstances in which being that Tulayha infiltrated the Sassanid camps under the cover of darkness, singlehandedly wreaking havoc in their camps, killing two Sassanid soldiers, taking two horses and then brought back one captive to Sa'd ibn Abi Waqqas. (Note: Most Hadith scholars expressed their skepticism regarding historical narration of Sayf ibn Umar although non narrative historical informations of him was not criticized.).

Muhammad Husayn Haykal in his book of Umar's biography, also borrowed the same circumstances and wrote the aftermath of the raid as following: Sa'd asking the Sassanid captive about what happened, the latter answered:

Since I was a child, I have been told about the stories about heroes. But I never imagined this: This man has travelled about two farsakh 12 kilometres (7.5 mi) into a camp manned by 70,000 soldiers. He won't return before seizing the enemy's horses and tearing down large tents. After we (the Sassanid soldiers) catch up with him, the first of our champions which [is] equal to 1000 soldiers was killed by him (Tulayha). Then the second man, equal to the first man. Then I catch up with him (Tulayha) and I appoint my reserve to replace my position as I was ready to face death to exact revenge of my peers (killed by Tulayha). But now I am a prisoner.

The Sassanid prisoner later converted to Islam and gave valuable information to the Muslim army.

Another record from the notoriously dubious account of Ya'qubi recorded that Tulayha was among the ones who found the corpse of Rostam Farrokhzād. (Note: Skepticism regarding Ya'qubi works were exist as he was accused with bias of Shiite sympathy regarding his works.)

Later he fought his last battle in the Battle of Nahāvand alongside the Muslim armies and later died as Shahid in that battle.

== Death ==
Tulayha was slain at the last battle in Nahavand. However, his performance was pivotal in Muslims victory in this battle.

== Appraisal ==
When Saad bin Abi Waqqas asked Caliph Umar to send him reinforcements, Umar replied: "I have sent you 2000 men: Amru bin Ma'adi Yakrib and Tulayhah Asadi. Each one of them counts as a thousand." Jabir bin Abdullah has found the praising about Tulayha that he said among soldiers that participating in the battle of al-Qadisiyah that had not desired worldly gain and also exceptionally pious and trustworthy, they are Tulayhah bin Khuwailid Al-Asadi, 'Amr bin Ma'di Karb (another former apostate leader) and Qays ibn Makshuh ('Amr bin Ma'di Yakrib's nephew and Asma' bint Nu'man second husband).

== See also ==
- Musaylimah
- Al-Aswad Al-Ansi
- Sajah
- Saf ibn Sayyad
- Ridda Wars
