= Musaylima =

7th-century Arabian claimant of prophethood

- مسيلمة
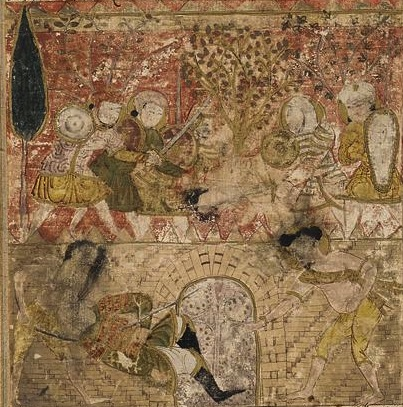
- Miniature depicting the killing scene of Musaylima at the hands of Wahshi ibn Harb; from a manuscript of Tarikhnama
- Born: 582 al-Yamama
- Died: 632 (aged 50) al-Yamama
- Resting place: Not Known
- Other names: Maslama ibn Habib; Musaylima al-Kadhab / Musaylima the Liar
- Spouse: Sajah bint al-Harith
- Parents: Habib (father); Not Known (mother)

Musaylima (Arabic: مسيلمة, full name Muslima ibn Habib al-Hanafi; died 632) (Note: otherwise known as Abū Thumāma Musaylima ibn Ḥabīb (Arabic: أبو ثمامة مسيلمة ابن حبيب) or Musaylima ibn Thumāma ibn Kathīr ibn Ḥabīb (Arabic: مسيلمة بن ثمامة بن كثير بن حبيب)) was a claimant of prophethood from the Banu Hanifa tribe. Based from Diriyah in present-day Riyadh, Saudi Arabia, he claimed to be a prophet. He was a leader of the tribal rebellion during the Ridda wars. He is commonly called Musaylima al-Kadhab (مسيلمة الكذاب, 'Musaylima the Arch-Liar') by Muslims. Musaylima was said to have composed in saj', a type of rhymed prose that was common in pre-Islamic artistic speech.

Musaylima's career has been compared with a larger trend of pre-Islamic Arabian Prophet claimants of the sixth and seventh centuries among others like Khalid ibn Sinan, Al-Aswad al-Ansi, Ibn Sayyad, and Sajah bint al-Harith.

== Etymology ==
Musaylima's actual name was Maslama, but Muslims altered his name to Musaylima, which is the diminutive of Maslama (i.e., 'Little Maslama'). The name maslama contains an Arabic or Syriac participal-nominal substratum like muslim (submitter). Maslama may be a title derived from aslam which is a verb associated with prophethood.

== Historicity ==
Christian J. Robin argued that Musaylima was a historical figure, and that some parts of the narrative of Musaylima may be recovered as historical, principally the account of the conflict between Musaylima's principality and the early Muslims after the death of Muhammad during the Ridda Wars; Robin argues that these political events were too notable to have been fabricated wholesale. Robin also entertains the possibility that much of Musaylima's story may have been retained from an early period because it would have been interesting to the early Muslims: it was widely believed in the Near East that a true Prophet is always preceded by a false prophet, and so details about the life of Musaylima could may have been studied out of a sense that he served as that antecedent and contrast for Muhammad. Nevertheless, Robin also accepts the possibility that parts of the story of Musaylima's life have been distorted.

Gerald Hawting, by contrast, considers reports of Musaylima's activity, at least any activity before that or independently of Muhammad's, to be a later fabrication exegetically inspired by attempts to contextualize Quran 16:103 in the life of Muhammad.

== Biography ==
=== Early life ===
Musaylima was the son of Habib, of the tribe Banu Hanifa, one of the largest tribes of Arabia that inhabited the region of Najd. The Banu Hanifa were a monotheist branch of Banu Bakr and led an independent existence prior to Islam.

Among the first accounts of him describe events in the late 9th Hijri, the Year of Delegations, when he accompanied a delegation of his tribe to Medina. The delegation included two other prominent Muslims. They would later help Musaylima rise to power and save their tribe from destruction. These men were Nahar Ar-Rajjal ibn Unfuwa and Muja'a ibn Marara. In Medina, the deputation stayed with the daughter of al-Harith, a woman of the Ansar from the Banu Najjar. When the delegation arrived at Medina the camels were tied at a traveler's camp, and Musaylima remained there to look after them while the other delegates went in.

They had talks with Muhammad. The delegation before their departure embraced Islam and renounced Christianity without compunction. As was his custom, Muhammad presented gifts to the delegates, and when they had received their gifts one said, "We left one of our comrades in the camp to look after our mounts."

Muhammad gave them gifts for him also, and added, "He is not the least among you that he should stay behind to guard the property of his comrades." On their return they converted the tribe of Banu Hanifa to Islam.

=== Prophethood ===
Musaylima, who is alleged as having been a skilled magician by Muslim historians, is said to have performed unusual feats that amazed onlookers. Musaylima also shared verses purporting them to have been revelations from God.

Al-Tabari in his History of the Prophets and Kings chronicles that Musaylima also proposed to share power over Arabia with Muhammad. In 10 Hijri, he wrote to Muhammad:

"From Musaylimah, Messenger of God, to Muhammad, Messenger of God. Salutations to you. I have been given a share with you in this matter. Half the earth belongs to us and half to the Quraish. But the Quraish are people who transgress."

Muhammad, is said to have replied:

"From Muhammad, the Messenger of God, to Musaylimah, the arch-liar. Peace be upon him who follows (God's) guidance. Now then, surely the earth belongs to God, who bequeaths it to whom He will amongst his servants. The ultimate issue is to the God-fearing."

Tabari also mentions that Musaylima set up a "sacred enclave" in the Yamamah, which contained the villages of the Ahalif, so that if anyone attacked them, they would be violating sacred grounds.

Ibn Kathir in his Tafsir Ibn Kathir wrote that Musaylima attempted to produce a surah like the Quran: "O Wabr, O Wabr! You are only two ears and a chest, and the rest of you is digging and burrowing."

=== Ridda Wars and relationship with Sajah bint al-Harith ===
During the Ridda wars which emerged following the death of Muhammad, Sajah bint al-Harith declared that she was a prophetess after learning that Musaylima and Tulayha had declared prophethood. 4,000 people gathered around her to march on Medina. Others joined her against Medina. However, her planned attack on Medina was called off after she learned that the army of Khalid ibn al-Walid had defeated Tulayha al-Asadi (another self-proclaimed prophet). Thereafter, she sought cooperation with Musaylima to oppose the threat of Khalid. A mutual understanding was initially reached with Musaylima. Eventually, the two married and she accepted his prophethood (although she later recanted and died a Muslim). Khalid then defeated the remaining rebellious elements around Sajah, and then moved on to defeat Musaylima.

=== Death ===
Musaylima fought in the Battle of Yamama, and was killed by Wahshi ibn Harb.

== Dabestan-e Mazaheb ==
The Dabestan-e Mazaheb, a 17th-century work on the religious beliefs in India during the time claims a religion called the Sadakiyya who followed Musaylima existed then. The work chronicles the alleged teachings of Musaylima according to an informant belonging to the group. At the Mughal ruler Akbar's council of religions, a discussion on Sadakiyya also took place with the help of its priests.

In the account of Musaylima in the Dabestan-e Mazaheb, he taught 3 daily prayers to God, facing any direction. He criticized Muslims for selecting the Ka'aba as the direction of prayers, arguing that God is not limited to one direction. Musaylima declared that the Ka'aba was not the house of God, because an all-powerful God has no need for a house. Musaylima said fasting should be at night instead of daytime during Ramadan, he prohibited both circumcision and intoxicants, for marriage, “neither witnesses nor ceremonies are required; acquiescence and agreement of two persons in a retired place are sufficient”, he prohibited cousin marriage and polygamy, though he permitted taking another partner in temporary cohabitation, he declared that any slave who converted to his religion would become free, he stated that Iblis did not exist, because a fair and merciful God would not allow a being like Iblis to throw people into error, and he also said it was wrong to include his name or any prophet’s name in worship to God.

== See also ==
- Al-Aswad Al-Ansi
- Ibn an-Nawwaha
- Non-Muslim interactants with Muslims during Muhammad's era
- Ridda wars
- Saf ibn Sayyad
- Sajah bint Harith
- Tulayha
- Prophets and messengers in Islam
- Seal of the Prophets
