= Adi ibn Hatim =

Sahabah

'Adi ibn Hatim at-Tayy عدي بن حاتم الطائي
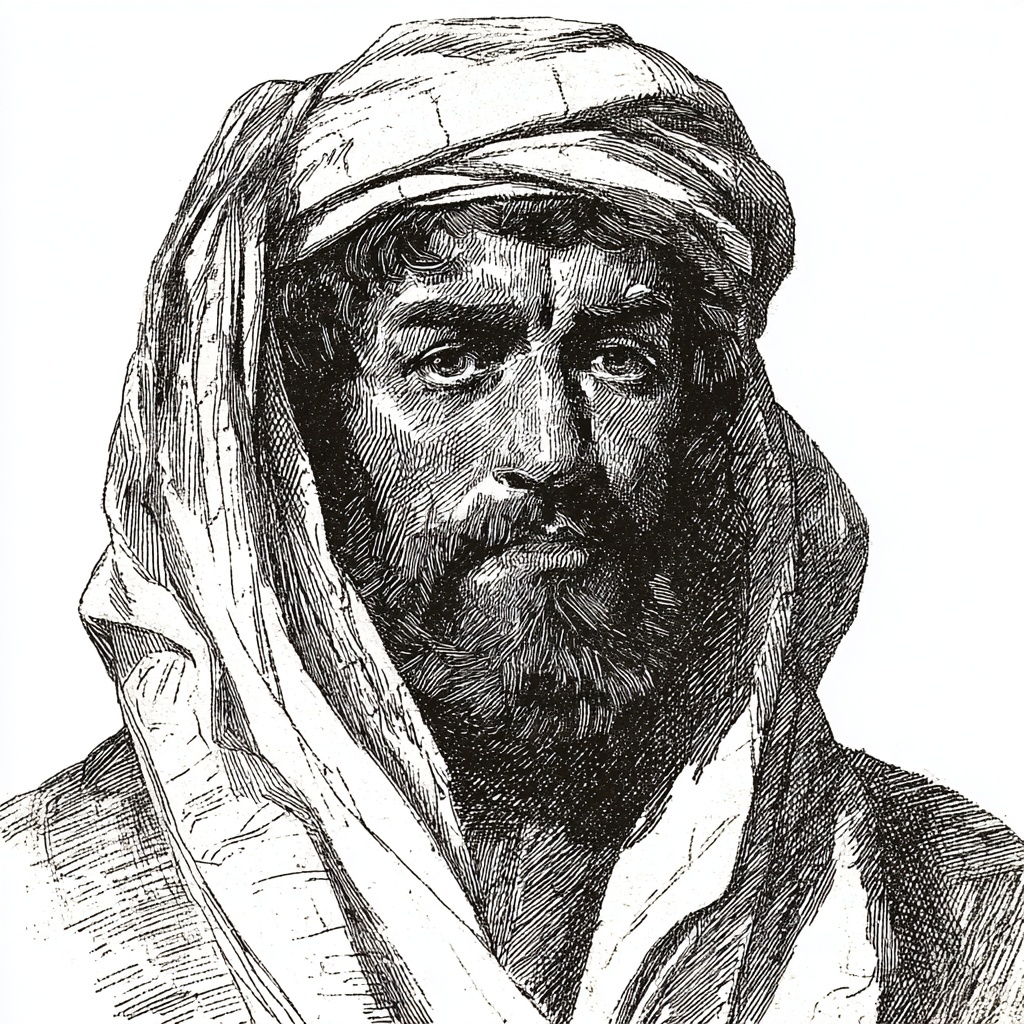

Personal details
- Born: 572
- Died: 687 (aged 115)

Adi ibn Hatim al-Tai (Arabic: عدي بن حاتم الطائي, romanized: ʿAdī ibn Ḥātim al-Ṭāʾī) was a leader of the Arab tribe of Tayy, and one of the companions of Muhammad. He was the son of the poet Hatim al-Tai. Adi remained antagonistic to Islam for about twenty years until he converted to Islam in 630 (9th year of Hijri).

== Biography ==
Adiyy inherited the domain of his father and was confirmed in the position by the Tayy people. He received a quarter of any amount they stole in raiding expeditions.

=== Before Islam ===
Adi said that before being preached to by Muhammad he practiced Rakusiyya, a syncretic sect which adhered to teachings of both Christianity and Judaism, or a syncretic mixture of Christianity and Sabian religion.

Clément Huart has theorized this sect was linked to Manichaeism due to its syncretic nature. According to Khalid Basalamah, the sect was regarded as heretical by the official Eastern Orthodox Church of the Byzantine Empire, so Adi practiced it in secrecy, fearing persecution from his Byzantine overlord.

He also identified himself as being a Hanif.

=== After Islam ===
After converting to Islam, he joined the Islamic army at the time of caliph Abu Bakr. He was a commander of the Islamic army sent to invade Iraq under the command of Khalid ibn al-Walid.

Adi participated in the Khalid desert crossing from Iraq to the Levant, and fought on the side of Ali ibn Abi Talib, at the Battle of Camel and Battle of Siffin.

Adi was a hunter, and multiple hadith in Sahih Bukhari and Sahih Muslim are attributed to him regarding its rulings, including the use of tools and dogs.

== Legacy ==
Bukhari, Muslim, Ahmad ibn Hanbal, and others have attributed hadiths to him.

== See also ==
- List of Sahabah
