= Meir Jacob Kister =

Polish-born Jewish Arabist in Israel

- מאיר יעקב קיסטר
- Born: 16 January 1914; Mościska, Poland
- Died: 16 August 2010 (aged 96); Jerusalem, Israel
- Awards: Israel Prize (1981); Rothschild Prize (1988)

Academic background
- Education: Hebrew University of Jerusalem

Academic work
- Discipline: Arabist
- Sub-discipline: Islamic studies
- Institutions: Hebrew University of Jerusalem
- Notable works: Studies in Arabic Literature and History

Meir Jacob Kister (Hebrew: מאיר יעקב קיסטר; 16 January 1914 in Mościska – 16 August 2010 in Jerusalem) was a Jewish Arabist from Poland who worked in Israel.

== Career ==
Kister went to school in Sanok and Przemyśl. In 1932 he began studies in law at the University of Lviv, but in 1933 he moved to Warsaw, where he worked in a publishing house. In 1939 he emigrated to Palestine, where he studied Arabic in the Hebrew University of Jerusalem, among others under David Hartwig Baneth and Shlomo Dov Goitein. In 1945–46 he worked as press secretary of the Polish embassy at Beirut. From 1946 to 1958 he taught Arabic at the Hebrew Reali School in Haifa.

At the same time he continued his studies, achieving an M.A. in 1949 and completing his Ph.D. in 1964. Starting 1958, he taught at the Hebrew University, where he was active as a senior lecturer starting 1964, and as a professor from 1970 until his retirement in 1983. He helped to establish the Arabic Departments in the universities of Tel Aviv and Haifa.

Since 1975 he was a member of the Israel Academy of Sciences. In 1981 he received the Israel Prize, and in 1988 the Rothschild Prize.

He is the father of biblical scholar Menahem Kister.

== Sources ==
- Biography of Prof. M. J. Kister at Hebrew University of Jerusalem (in English)
- Tottoli, R. (2010). MEIR J. KISTER (1914-2010). Oriente Moderno, 90(2), 299-302 (in Italian)
