= Battle of al-Yamama =

632 battle of the Ridda wars

Coordinates: 24.1483°N 47.3050°E

- Part of Ridda Wars and Campaigns of Khalid ibn al-Walid
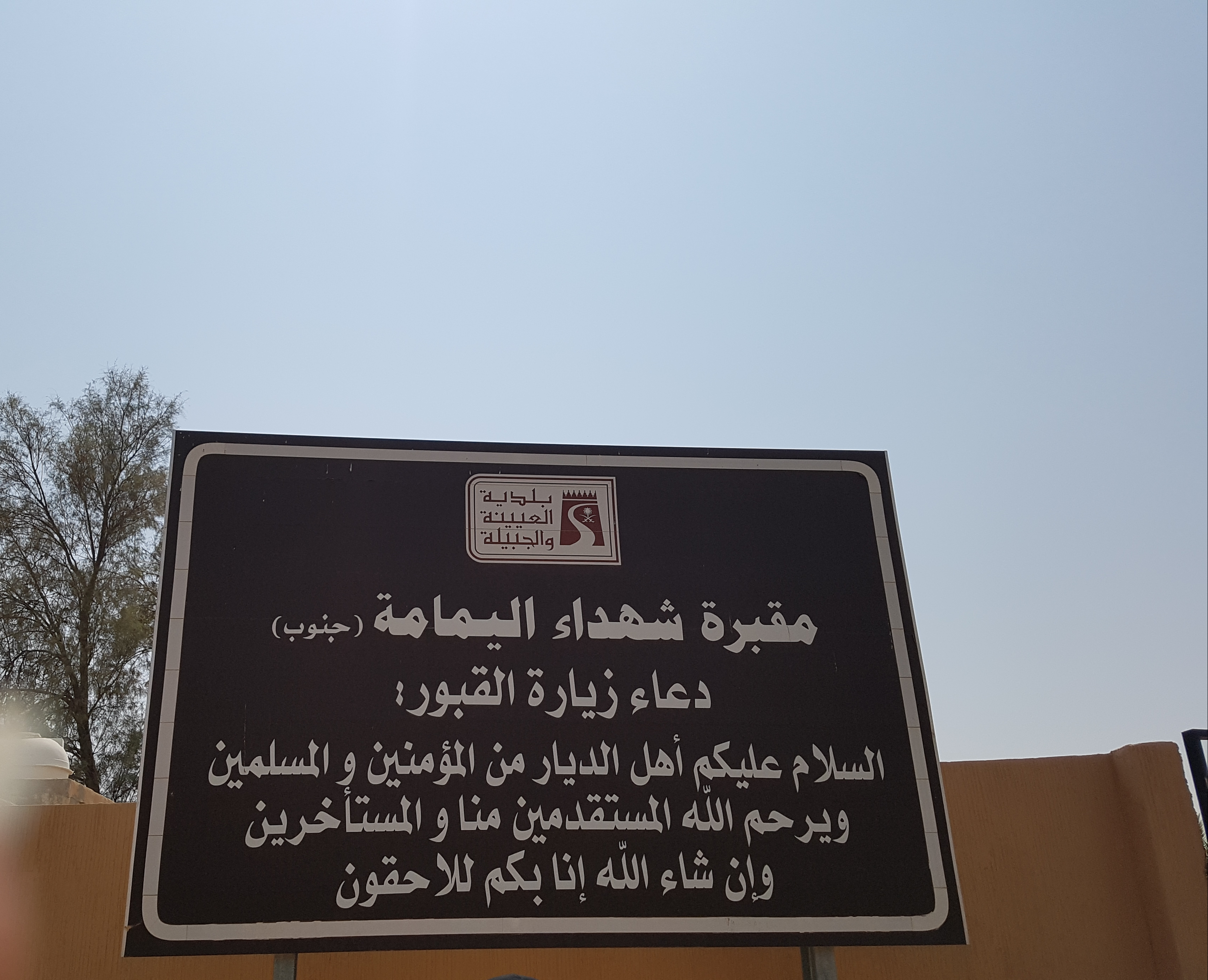
- Cemetery of Muslim soldiers who fell in the Battle of Yamama
Date	December 632 CE
Location	Plain of Aqraba, al-Yamama, Arabia
Result	Rashidun Caliphate victory

Belligerents
Rashidun Caliphate	Banu Hanifa and Musaylima's followers

Commanders and leaders
Khalid ibn al-Walid; Shurahbil ibn Hasana; Zayd ibn al-Khattab †; Abu Dujana †; Abu Hudhayfa ibn Utba †; Salim ibn Ma'qil †; Ikrima ibn Amr; Ammar ibn Yasir al-Bara' ibn Malik; Abd Allah ibn Suhayl †	Musaylima †; Al-Rijal ibn Anfuwa †; Muhkam ibn al-Tufayl †

Strength
10,000 (before reinforcements) 13,000 (after reinforcements)	40,000 – 100,000

Casualties and losses
1,200	10,000 – 21,000

The Battle of al-Yamama was fought in December 632 as part of the Ridda Wars against a rebellion within the Rashidun Caliphate in the region of al-Yamama (in present-day Saudi Arabia, south of Riyadh) between the forces of Abu Bakr and Musaylima, a self-proclaimed prophet. The multi-pronged battle took place on the plain of Aqraba and ended in a walled garden known as the "Garden of Death" (Arabic: حديقة الموت, romanized: Ḥadīqat al-Mawt).

== Background ==
After the death of the Islamic prophet Muhammad in June 632, many Arab tribes rebelled against the State of Medina. Caliph Abu Bakr organized 11 corps to deal with the rebels. Abu Bakr appointed Ikrima ibn Amr as the commander of one of the corps. Ikrima's orders were to advance and make contact with the forces of Musaylima at al-Yamama, but not to get involved in battle with him. Ikrima had insufficient forces to attack the overwhelmingly more numerous foe. Khalid ibn al-Walid was chosen to command the forces opposing Musaylima after he dealt with smaller forces of other apostates. Abu Bakr's intention in giving Ikrima this mission was to tie Musaylima down at al-Yamama. With Ikrima on the horizon, Musaylima would remain in expectation of an attack and thus not be able to leave his base. With Musaylima so committed, Khalid would be free to deal with the rebels of North-Central Arabia without interference from al-Yamama.

Ikrima advanced with his corps and established a camp somewhere in the region of al-Yamama. The following passage has been quoted directly from and is written in the form of a legend or epic with a moral at the end. When Ikrima received reports of the defeat of Tulayha by Khalid, he began to get impatient for battle. Ikrima was a fearless man and a forceful general, but he lacked Khalid's cool judgement and patience – qualities which distinguish the bold commander from the rash one. The next development that Ikrima heard of was that Shurahbil ibn Hasana was marching to join him. Shurahbil too had been given a corps by the Caliph with orders to follow Ikrima, and await further instructions. In a few days, Shurahbil would be with him. Then came news of how Khalid had routed the forces of Salma, the queenly leader of men. Ikrima could wait no longer, and he set his corps in motion. This happened at the end of October 632 (end of Rajab, 11 Hijri). He was defeated by Musaylima. He wrote to Abu Bakr and gave him a complete account of his actions. Abu Bakr was both pained and angered by the rashness of Ikrima and his disobedience to the orders given to him. Abu Bakr ordered him to march to Mahra to help Arfaja and thereafter go to Yemen to help Muhajir. Shurahbil remained in the region of al-Yamama. To ensure that he did not fall into the error of Ikrima, Abu Bakr wrote to him: "Stay where you are and await further instructions."

The Caliph sent for Khalid and gave him the mission of destroying the forces of Musaylima at al-Yamama. In addition to his own large corps, Khalid would have under his command the corps of Shurahbil. Khalid rode to Buta where his old corps awaited him. Meanwhile, the Caliph wrote to Shurahbil to work under Khalid ibn al-Walid's command. A few days before Khalid's arrival Shurahbil had given in to the same temptation as Ikrima; he had advanced and clashed with Musaylima, but was defeated. Khalid got news that Musaylima was encamped in the plain of Aqraba with an army of 40,000 warriors. The two successful actions fought by them against Ikrima and Shurahbil had increased their confidence in themselves and created an aura of invincibility around Musaylima.

== Second strike of the Muslims ==
On the orders of Khalid, the Muslims advanced. They launched a series of attacks along their entire front. The most dreadful carnage took place in a gulley in which human blood ran in a rivulet down to the wadi. As a result, this gulley became known as the Gulley of Blood-Shueib-ud-Dam, and it is still known by that name.

The battle hung in the balance. As the first period of combat ended, the warriors retired to rest.

The next phase of battle - known as the second strike of the Muslims - is clouded with legend but from the stories alone we can determine that the enemy force largely disintegrated.

== Last phase of the battle ==
Only about a quarter of Musaylima's army remained in fighting shape, and this part hastened to the walled garden while Muhkam (commander of the right wing) covered its retreat with a small rear-guard. Soon the Muslims arrived at the walled garden, where a little over 7,000 rebels, Musaylima among them, had taken shelter. The rebels had closed the gate. The Muslims were anxious to get into the garden and kill the fighters.

Soon a Muslim soldier al-Bara' ibn Malik asked his fellow men to let him climb the wall so that he could open the gate by killing the guards there. The soldier jumped into the garden and opened the gate. The Muslims entered the garden and the last phase of the Battle of al-Yamama had begun.

=== Garden of Death ===
The rebels stepped back as the Muslims poured into the garden, where the fighting became increasingly vicious. Musaylima continued to fight with no intention of surrendering, eventually joining the combat as the front closed in on him. During the engagement, Abd al-Rahman ibn Abi Bakr shot and killed Muhkam with an arrow. The last phase of the battle reached its climax when Musaylima was targeted by Wahshi ibn Harb, the same man who had killed Hamza, the uncle of Muhammad, at the Battle of Uhud. Wahshi used his javelin to strike Musaylima, though historical accounts regarding Musaylima's exact killer remained contested. While Mu'awiya ibn Abi Sufyan claimed to have dealt the fatal blow, a claim supported by the Umayyads and later echoed in reports where Caliph Abd al-Malik ibn Marwan deemed a witness description to favor Mu'awiya, others attributed the act to Wahshi himself, who famously remarked that he had killed the best of men and the worst of men. Still, various alternative traditions assigned the deed to different combatants, such as Abd Allah ibn Zayd or Abu Dujana. Regardless of the conflicting claims over his final moments, Musaylima's death led to the complete rout of his forces. The garden where this final phase took place became known as the Garden of Death, as approximately 7,000 rebels perished within it.

=== Aftermath ===
The rebellion within the Rashidun Caliphate was crushed, and victory belonged to Abu Bakr. The people of Medina experienced sadness and joy with that battle. They were satisfied that the chaos caused by Musaylima was put to an end, but the cost of a martyr from every home also was devastating to them.

== Impact ==
The battle played a major role in motivating Abu Bakr to complete the compilation of the Qur'an. During the life of Muhammad, many parts of the written Quran were scattered among his companions, retained as private possession. However, about 360 huffaz (Muslims who had memorized the Qur'an) died at al-Yamama. Consequently, upon the insistence of his future successor Umar, Abu Bakr ordered what is known as the first standardisation of the Qur'an. He ordered Zayd ibn Thabit (who was a Hafiz himself) to collect all the pieces (whether on papyrus, palm stock, etc.) of the Qur'an into one copy, with the criterion that every verse of the Qur'an had to be memorised by two huffaz at least.

== Bibliography ==
- A.I. Akram, The Sword of Allah: Khalid bin al-Waleed, His Life and Campaigns, Nat. Publishing. House, Rawalpindi (1970) ISBN 0-7101-0104-X.
- Al-Baladhuri, Ahmad ibn Yahya (2022). Kennedy, Hugh (ed.). History of the Arab Invasions: The Conquest of the Lands: A New Translation of al-Baladhuri's Futuh al-Buldan. Bloomsbury Publishing. ISBN 9780755637416.
