= Rashidun Caliphate =

First Islamic caliphate (632–661)

Rashidun Caliphate الخلافة الرّاشدة (Arabic) al-Khilāfat ar-Rāshidah
- 632–661
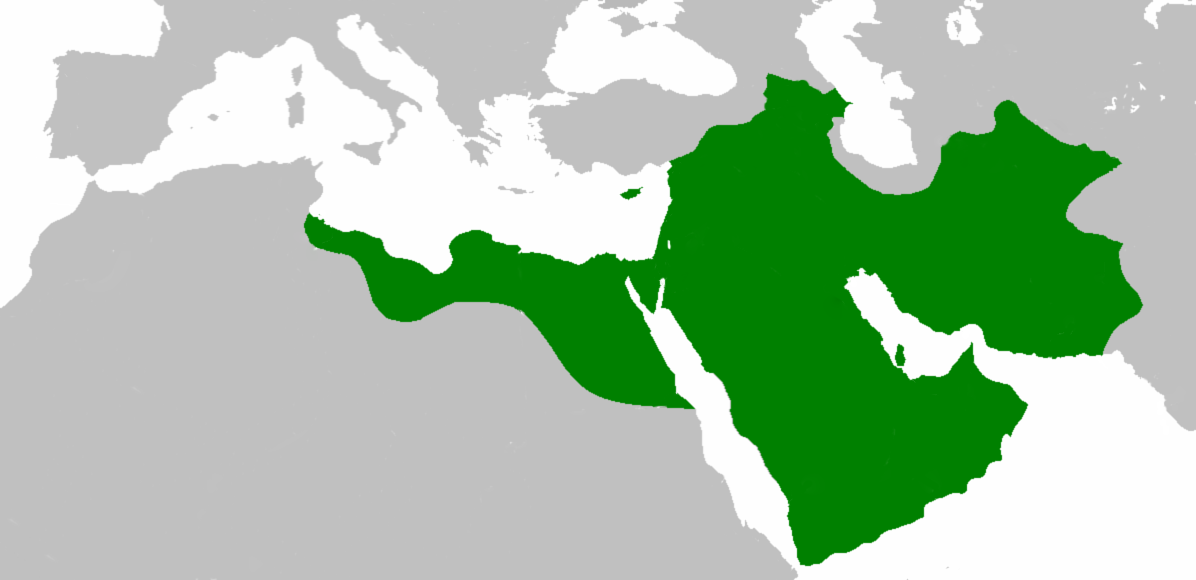
- The Rashidun Caliphate at its greatest extent under Uthman, c. 655
- Status: Caliphate
- Capital: Medina (632–656); Kufa (656–661)
- Official languages: Arabic
- Common languages: Various regional languages
- Religion: Islam (state)
- Government: Consultative caliphate
- Caliph
  - 632–634: Abu Bakr
  - 634–644: Umar
  - 644–656: Uthman
  - 656–661: Ali
- History
  - Succession to Muhammad: 632
  - Conquest of Persia: 633–654
  - Ascension of Umar: 634
  - Election of Uthman: 644
  - Election of Ali: 656
  - Assassination of Ali: 661

Area
- 655: 6,400,000 km^{2} (2,500,000 sq mi)
- Currency: Dirham
Preceded by
First Islamic state
Byzantine Empire
Sasanian Empire
Succeeded by
Umayyad Caliphate

The Rashidun Caliphate (Arabic: الخلافة الرّاشدة, romanized: al-Khilāfat ar-Rāshidah) was the early Islamic polity led by the four "Rightly Guided" caliphs, Abu Bakr, Umar, Uthman, and Ali, who governed the Muslim community (Ummah) from the death of the Islamic prophet Muhammad in 632 CE to the establishment of the Umayyad Caliphate in 661 CE.

The caliphate's first 25 years were characterized by rapid military expansion during which it became the most powerful economic and military force in West Asia and Northeast Africa. By the 650s, in addition to the Arabian Peninsula, the caliphate had subjugated the Levant and parts of Transcaucasia to the north; North Africa from Egypt to the edge of present-day Tunisia in the west; and regions stretching from the Iranian Plateau to parts of Central and South Asia in the east. The caliphate ended after five years of internal strife.

Following Muhammad's death in June 632, Muslim leaders debated who should succeed him. Unlike later caliphates which were ruled by hereditary dynasties, the Rashidun caliphs were either chosen by a small group of high-ranking companions of Muhammad in shūrā (lit. 'consultation') (Note: Abu Bakr, Uthman and Ali were chosen this way) or nominated by their predecessor. (Note: Abu Bakr appointed Umar as his successor before dying in 634 AD.) Muhammad's close companion and father-in-law Abu Bakr (r. 632–634), of the Banu Taym, was elected the first caliph in Medina and presided over the conquest of the Arabian Peninsula. The only Rashidun caliph not to die by assassination, he was succeeded by Umar (r. 634–644) of the Banu Adi, who was also a father-in-law of Muhammad. During Umar's reign, the caliphate expanded at an unprecedented rate, conquering more than two-thirds of the Byzantine Empire and nearly the entire Sasanian Empire.

Following the assassination of Umar, Uthman (r. 644–656) of the Banu Umayya, who was a senior companion and son-in-law of Muhammad, was elected caliph. His reign saw the completion of the conquest of Persia in 651 and continued military campaigns into Byzantine territories. Uthman was assassinated in June 656 and was succeeded by Ali (r. 656–661) of the Banu Hashim, the cousin and son-in-law of Muhammad, who moved the caliphate's capital to Kufa. Ali's accession to the caliphate triggered the First Fitna, a civil war ignited by the refusal of Uthman's Umayyad kinsman and the long-time governor of Syria, Mu'awiya ibn Abi Sufyan (r. 661–680), to recognize Ali's authority unless Uthman's killers were brought to justice.

After the Battle of Siffin between Ali's Iraqi army and Mu'awiya's Syrian forces, which resulted in a stalemate and inconclusive arbitration, a faction of Ali's erstwhile supporters, known as the Kharijites, seceded and rebelled against both sides, opposing his decision to arbitrate with Mu'awiya. Following Ali's assassination by a Kharijite dissident in 661, Mu'awiya invaded Iraq with his Syrian army and compelled Ali's eldest son and successor Hasan—who had been chosen as caliph in Kufa—to abdicate in his favour. Mu'awiya then entered Kufa and received the pledge of allegiance from the Iraqis, thus founding the Umayyad Caliphate.

== Terminology ==
The Arabic word rāshid (راشد) means "one who follows the right path", and the honorific title al-Khulafāʾ ar-Rāshidūn (الْخُلَفاءُ الرّاشِدُونَ) translates as "the Rightly Guided Caliphs". In Sunni Islam, the term signifies that these caliphs possessed superior piety and religious authority, and that their era represented a golden age following Muhammad.

During the eighth and ninth centuries, there was a diversity of opinions about which caliphs were rāshidūn. After the ninth century, however, the first four caliphs became canonical as rāshidun in Sunni Islam. The Umayyad caliph Umar ibn Abd al-Aziz (r. 717–720) was cited as a fifth rāshidun caliph by the Sunni hadith collector Abu Dawud al-Sijistani (d. 889). Another hypothesis may have included Hasan ibn Ali (c. 625–670) as a fifth rāshidun caliph, because his six-month reign was needed to complete a thirty-year period after Abu Bakr's ascension, which was predicted by Muhammad in a Sunni hadith as the length of the prophetic succession. (Note: This is also implied by Abu Dawud al-Tayalisi's version of this hadith, which avoided counting Hasan as the fifth rāshid caliph by adding six months to Umar's caliphate; see Melchert 2020, p. 71. The Islamist religious scholar and historian Ali al-Sallabi regards Hasan as a rāshid caliph, citing the fact that some Sunni scholars such as Ibn Kathir (c. 1300–1373) and Ibn Hajar al-Haytami (1503–1566) also held this view.)

In Shi'ism, the temporal and spiritual heritage of Muhammad is represented by the Imams, who (except for the first Imam Ali, who was his son-in-law) were his descendants. The first three Rashidun caliphs are regarded in Shi'a Islam as having usurped the rights of Ali, and the later Umayyad and Abbasid caliphs are regarded as having usurped the rights of the following Imams.

Ibadism does not see the caliphate as an institution that includes all believers and that must be obeyed. It considers the first two caliphs after Muhammad, Abu Bakr and Umar, as being on the right path; and their successors, including Uthman and Ali, as having strayed into injustice.

== History ==
=== Background ===
According to the traditional account, Muhammad began receiving what Muslims consider to be divine revelations in 610 CE, calling for submission to the one God, preparation for the imminent Last Judgement, and charity for the poor and needy. (Note: "Key themes in these early recitations include the idea of the moral responsibility of man who was created by God and the idea of the judgment to take place on the day of resurrection. [...] Another major theme of Muhammad's early preaching, [... is that] there is a power greater than man's, and that the wise will acknowledge this power and cease their greed and suppression of the poor.") As Muhammad's message began to attract followers, he was also met with increasing hostility and persecution from Meccan elites. (Note: "At first Muhammad met with no serious opposition [...] He was only gradually led to attack on principle the gods of Mecca. [...] Meccan merchants then discovered that a religious revolution might be dangerous to their fairs and their trade.") In 622 CE Muhammad migrated to the city of Yathrib (now known as Medina), where he began to unify the tribes of Arabia under Islam, returning to Mecca to take control in 630 and order the destruction of all pagan idols. By the time Muhammad died c. 11 AH (632 CE), almost all the tribes of the Arabian Peninsula had converted to Islam, but disagreement broke out over who would succeed him as leader of the Muslim community.

Among those seeking to be the successor of Muhammad were:

- the Muhajirun, senior companions of Muhammad, including those known as "The ten to whom Paradise was promised" (al-ʿashara al-mubashsharūn).
- the Banu Hashim; members of the Hashemite clan including Ali and Abbas ibn Abd al-Muttalib, who were the closest blood relatives to Muhammad;
- the Ansar; the people of Medina who had sheltered Muhammad and the early Muslims but were now "fed up" with being dominated by refugees from Mecca.
- the members of the aristocratic Quraysh tribe, including the powerful Umayyad clan who held a strong position in Mecca and maintained influential commercial and financial ties.

In determining Muhammad's successor, the strong support and companionship given to him from the early years of his prophethood, praise given by Muhammad and the close kinship ties established with him came to the fore as the determining attitude. The first two caliphs gave their daughters to Muhammad in marriage while the next two married with Muhammad's daughters.

=== Timeline ===
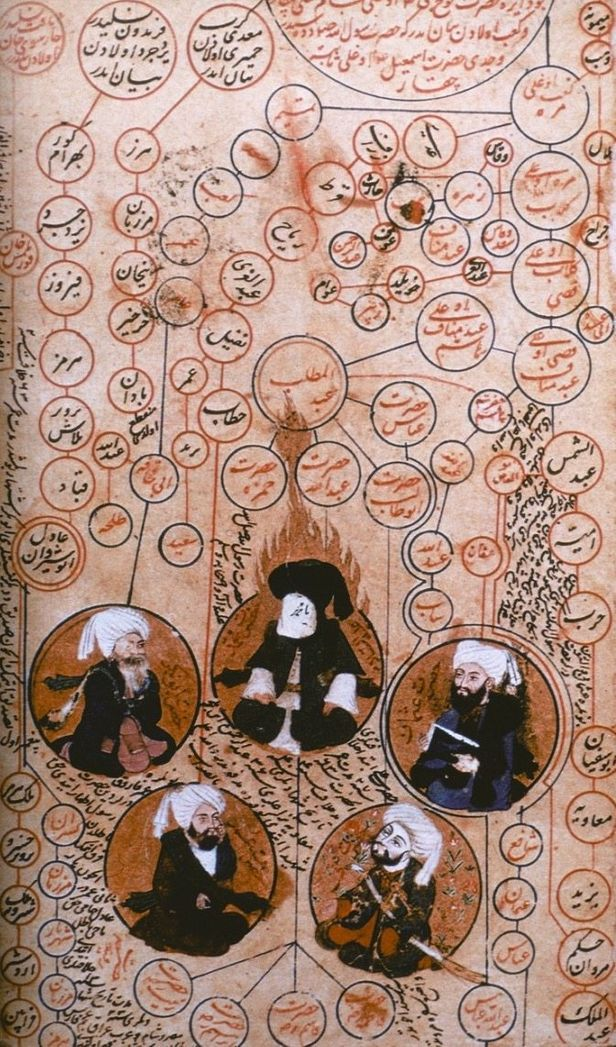
Ottoman miniature paintings depicting Muhammad (center) and the Rashidun caliphs Abu Bakr, Umar, Uthman, and Ali, c. 16th century

(Note that a caliph's succession does not necessarily occur on the first day of the new year.)

=== Abu Bakr's reign (632–634) ===
==== Origin and accession to Caliphate ====
After Muhammad's death in 632 AD (11 AH), a gathering of the Ansar (lit. 'Helpers'), the natives of Medina, took place in the Saqifah (courtyard) of the Banu Sa'ida clan. The general belief at the time was that the purpose of the meeting was for the Ansar to decide on a new leader of the Muslim community among themselves, with the intentional exclusion of the Muhajirun (migrants from Mecca), though this has later become the subject of debate.

Nevertheless, Abu Bakr and Umar, both prominent companions of Muhammad, upon learning of the meeting became concerned about a potential coup and hastened to the gathering. Upon arriving, Abu Bakr addressed the assembled men with a warning that any attempt to elect a leader outside of Muhammad's own tribe, the Quraysh, would likely result in dissension as only they can command the necessary respect among the community. He then took Umar and another companion, Abu Ubayda ibn al-Jarrah, by the hand and offered them to the Ansar as potential choices. He was countered with the suggestion that the Quraysh and the Ansar choose a leader each from among themselves, who would then rule jointly. The group grew heated upon hearing this proposal and began to argue amongst themselves. Umar hastily took Abu Bakr's hand and swore his own allegiance to the latter, an example followed by Abu Ubayda ibn al-Jarrah, the Ansar, the Quraysh tribe and other gathered men. Abu Bakr adopted the title of Khalīfaṫ Rasūl Allāh (خَلِيفةُ رَسُولِ اللهِ, "Successor of the Messenger of God").

Sunni Muslims believe that Abu Bakr was near-universally accepted as head of the Muslim community (under the title of Caliph) as a result of Saqifah, though he did face contention as a result of the rushed nature of the event. Shia Muslims contend that the debate between Muhammad's companions on which of them should succeed him in running the affairs of the Muslims took place in the absence of Muhammad's household, who were busy with his burial.

Several companions, most prominent among them being Ali ibn Abi Talib, initially refused to acknowledge his authority. Ali may have been reasonably expected to assume leadership, being both cousin and son-in-law to Muhammad. The theologian Ibrahim al-Nakha'i stated that Ali also had support among the Ansar for his succession, explained by the genealogical links he shared with them. Whether his candidacy for the succession was raised during Saqifah is unknown, though it is not unlikely. Abu Bakr later sent Umar to gain Ali's allegiance, resulting in an altercation. However, after six months, the group made peace with Abu Bakr and Ali offered him his fealty. In addition, Chamieh argues that the dissension of most of the tribes that had submitted to Islam during the Ridda Wars demonstrated not disbelief but that Abu Bakr did not have a consensus of the Muslim community to be caliph.

==== Ridda Wars ====
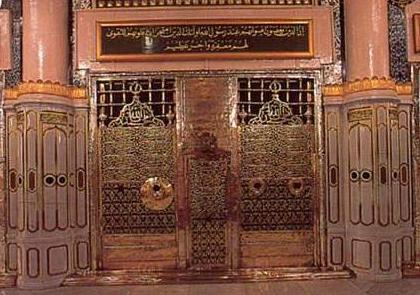
Tombs of the caliphs Abu Bakr and Umar (right), in Medina, present-day Saudi Arabia

Troubles emerged soon after Muhammad's death, threatening the unity and stability of the new community and state. Apostasy (in the form of new claimants to prophethood and the refusal of obedience and payment of taxes to Abu Bakr), spread to every tribe in the Arabian Peninsula with the exception of the people in Mecca and Medina, the Banu Thaqif in Taif, and the Banu Abd al-Qays of Oman. In some cases, entire tribes apostatized. Others merely withheld zakat, the alms tax, without formally challenging Islam. Many tribal leaders also made claims to prophethood; some even did so during the lifetime of Muhammad. The first incident of apostasy was fought and concluded while Muhammad still lived; a supposed prophet Aswad Ansi arose and invaded South Arabia; he was killed on 30 May 632 (6 Rabi' al-Awwal, 11 Hijri) by the Persian Muslim governor Fayruz al-Daylami. The news of his death reached Medina shortly after the death of Muhammad. The apostasy of al-Yamama was led by another supposed prophet, Musaylima, who arose before Muhammad's death; other centers of the rebels were in the Najd, Eastern Arabia (known then as al-Bahrayn) and South Arabia (known as al-Yaman and including the Mahra). Many tribes claimed that they had submitted to Muhammad and that with Muhammad's death, their allegiance was ended. Caliph Abu Bakr insisted that they had not just submitted to a leader but joined an ummah (أُمَّـة, community) of which he was the new head. The result of this situation was the Ridda wars.

The campaign against apostasy or the Ridda wars were fought and completed during the eleventh year of the Hijri. The year 12 Hijri dawned on 18 March 633 with the Arabian peninsula united under the caliph in Medina. Abu Bakr divided the Muslim army into several corps. The strongest corps and the primary force of the Muslims was the corps of Khalid ibn al-Walid, which was used to fight the most powerful of the rebel forces. Other corps were given areas of secondary importance in which to bring the less dangerous apostate tribes to submission. Abu Bakr's plan was first to clear Najd and Western Arabia near Medina, then tackle Malik ibn Nuwayra and his forces between the Najd and al-Bahrayn, and finally concentrate against the most dangerous enemy, Musaylima and his allies in al-Yamama. After a series of successful campaigns Khalid ibn al-Walid defeated Musaylima in the Battle of Yamama.

==== Expeditions to Persia and Syria ====
Islamic conquests 622–750: Expansion under Muhammad, 622–632 Expansion during the Rashidun Caliphate, 632–661 Expansion during the Umayyad Caliphate, 661–750

After Abu Bakr unified Arabia under Islam, he began the incursions into the Byzantine Empire and the Sasanian Empire. Whether or not he intended a full-out imperial conquest is hard to say; he did, however, set in motion a historical trajectory that in just a few short decades would lead to one of the largest empires in history. Abu Bakr began with Iraq, the richest province of the Sasanian Empire. He sent general Khalid ibn al-Walid to invade the Sassanian Empire in 633. He thereafter also sent four armies to invade the Roman province of Syria, but the decisive operation was only undertaken when Khalid, after completing the conquest of Iraq, was transferred to the Syrian front in 634.

=== Umar's reign (634–644) ===
Umar ibn al-Khattab (Arabic: عمر ابن الخطاب, romanized: ʿUmar ibn al-Khattāb, c. 586/590 – 644) c. 2 November (Dhu al-Hijjah 26, 23 Hijri) was a leading companion and adviser to Muhammad, and father-in-law by his daughter Hafsa bint Umar's marriage to Muhammad. He was appointed by a dying Abu Bakr to be his successor and took power on 23 August 634, becoming the second Muslim caliph after Muhammad's death. At least according to Laura Veccia Vaglieri, the expansion of Islam from an "isolated episode" in Arab history to an event of "worldwide importance" can be attributed to Umar's political skills.

Upon his accession, Umar adopted the title amir al-mu'minin (Commander of the Faithful) which later became the standard caliphal title. During his 10-year reign, the Islamic empire expanded at an unprecedented rate. Umar continued the war of conquests begun by Abu Bakr, pushing further into the Sassanian Empire, north into Byzantine territory, and went into Egypt. These were regions of great wealth controlled by powerful states, but the long conflict between Byzantines and Persians had left both sides militarily exhausted, and the Muslim armies easily prevailed against them. By 640, they had brought all of Mesopotamia, Syria and Palestine under the control of the Rashidun Caliphate; Egypt was conquered by 642, and almost the entire Sassanian Empire by 643.

While the caliphate continued its rapid expansion, Umar laid the foundations of a political structure that could hold it together. He created the Diwan, a bureau for transacting government affairs. The military was brought directly under state control and into its pay. Crucially, in conquered lands, Umar did not require that non-Muslim populations convert to Islam, nor did he try to centralize government. Instead, he allowed subject populations to retain their religion, language, and customs, and he left their government relatively untouched, imposing only a governor (amir) and a financial officer called an amil. These new posts were integral to the efficient network of taxation that financed the empire.

With the bounty secured from conquest, Umar was able to support its faith in material ways: the companions of Muhammad were given pensions on which to live, allowing them to pursue religious studies and exercise spiritual leadership in their communities and beyond. Upon entering Jerusalem, Umar ordered that rubbish be cleared away from the mount of the al-Masjid al-Aqsa (compound) and that a mosque be built there. Jebran Chamieh writes that Muslim stories passed down after his death stress Umar's "asceticism, his care for the poor and public money. Tradition claims that he had a single threadbare dress thawb which he patched with leather whenever it was torn. The purpose of these tales was to emphasize his piety and abnegation, and that he did not take money from the treasury", It is however difficult to reconcile these stories of self-denial "with the fact that the other leading Companions amassed great wealth", and Umar's share of the spoils from the conquered lands was at least equal to their shares.

Umar is also remembered for establishing the Islamic calendar; like the Arabian calendar, it is lunar, but the origin is set in 622, the year of the Hijra when Muhammad emigrated to Medina.

While Umar was leading the morning prayers in 644, he was assassinated by a Persian slave, Abu Lu'lu'a Firuz. He appointed Suhayb ibn Sinan to lead the prayers in his stead.

=== Uthman's reign (644–656) ===
Rashidun Caliphate at greatest extent (orthographic projection)

Uthman ibn Affan (Arabic: عثمان ابن عفان, romanized: ʿUthmān ibn ʿAffān) (c. 573 – 17 June 656), who became the third caliph at the age of 70, was one of the early companions, and son in law of Muhammad by marriage to two daughters of Muhammad and Khadija, Ruqayyah and Umm Kulthum. Uthman was born into the powerful Umayyad clan of the Meccan Quraysh tribe. Under his leadership, the empire expanded into Fars (present-day Iran), some of Khorasan (present-day Afghanistan), and Armenia. His rule ended when he was assassinated. Uthman is perhaps best known for forming the committee which standardised and canonised the Quran.

==== Election of Uthman ====
Before Umar died, he appointed a committee of six men to decide on the next caliph and charged them with choosing one of their own numbers. All of the men, like Umar, were from the tribe of Quraysh. His plan for choosing the next caliph has been criticized for its small size and unrepresentativeness, which excluded Muslims from Medina, Mecca, Taif, and other tribes; for his inclusion of a tie breaking seventh member who would be sure to veto Ali, and for instructions to execute committee members if the committee was deadlocked.

The committee narrowed down the choices to two: Uthman and Ali. Ali was from the Banu Hashim (the same clan as Muhammad) of the Quraysh tribe, and he was the cousin and son-in-law of Muhammad and had been one of his companions from the inception of his mission. Uthman was from the Umayyad clan of Quraysh. He was the second cousin and son-in-law of Muhammad and one of the early converts of Islam. Uthman was ultimately chosen as caliph.

==== Reign of Uthman ====
Uthman reigned for twelve years as caliph. During the first half of his reign, he had been popular, while in the latter half of his reign, he met increasing opposition, led by the Egyptians and concentrated around Ali, who would succeed Uthman as caliph.

Uthman's most lasting project was the final compilation of the Qur'an. Uthman formed the committee which was tasked with producing copies of the Quran based on text that had been gathered separately on parchment, bones and rocks during the lifetime of Muhammad. Under his authority diacritics were written with Arabic letters so that non-native speakers of Arabic could easily read the Qur'an. Uthman sent copies of the sacred text to each of the Muslim cities and garrison towns and destroyed variant texts.

Despite internal troubles, Uthman continued the wars of conquest started by Umar. The Rashidun army conquered North Africa from the Byzantines and even raided Spain, conquering the coastal areas of the Iberian Peninsula, as well as the islands of Rhodes and Cyprus. Coastal Sicily was raided in 652. The Rashidun army fully conquered the Sasanian Empire, and its eastern frontiers extended up to the lower Indus River.

==== Assassination of Uthman ====
Uthman was generous in distributing booty and land to his relatives and fellow companions in the Quraysh tribe. Governors under his jurisdiction were accused of extravagance and excessive tax collection. This provoked jealousy and resentment among excluded Muslims, especially in Egypt and Iraq, at a time when the numbers and power of the Quraysh were being diluted by the vast new conquered lands and converts to Islam. Outraged at what they considered the nepotism and corruption of Uthman, rebels from the provinces marched on Medina and put Uthman's house under siege, giving Uthman a choice between abdication or death.

Early caliphs had no security force to protect them. They depended on tribal levies from the Arabs whose loyalty came from the deference due to the Caliph as a successor of Muhammad. When Uthman lost that deference, he had little left to protect him. Uthman refused the rebels' demand to abdicate, declaring instead that "it is easier for me to die than to disown a mission (the caliphate) that God has entrusted to me." He then returned to his room to read the Quran as the protesters broke into his house from the back and killed him.

=== Ali's reign (656–661) ===
Ali ibn Abi Talib (Arabic: علي ابن أبي طالب, romanized: ʿAlī ibn Abī Ṭālib) was Muhammad's cousin and son-in-law. The fourth Rashidun caliph in Sunni Islam, Ali is considered the rightful successor of Muhammad in Shia Islam, whose appointment was a divine decree by Muhammad that was announced at the event of Ghadir Khumm and earlier in his prophetic mission.

In Islamic literature, Ali is credited with significant deeds, including being the first male to embrace Islam and the person who offered his support when Muhammad first presented Islam to his relatives; facilitating Muhammad's safe escape to Medina by risking his life as the decoy; swearing a pact of brotherhood with Muhammad in Medina; taking the hand of Muhammad's daughter Fatima in marriage; acting as Muhammad's secretary in Medina, and serving as his deputy during the expedition of Tabuk, being (according to many) the most able warrior in Muhammad's army and one of the two Muslim men who represented Islam before a Christian delegation from Najran.

==== Crisis and fragmentation ====
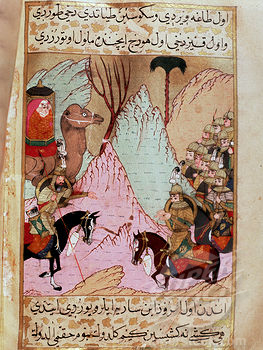
Muhammad's widow, Aisha, battling the fourth caliph Ali in the Battle of the Camel (16th-century miniature from a copy of the Siyer-i Nebi)

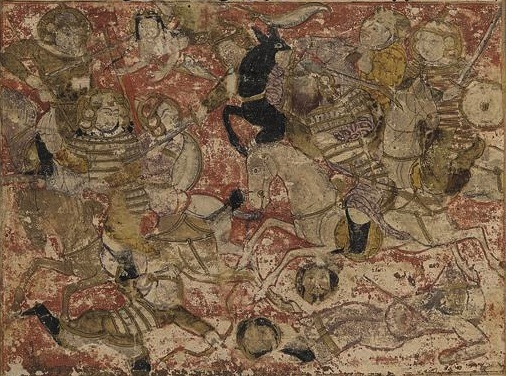
Illustration of the Battle of Siffin, from a 14th-century manuscript of the Tarikh-i Bal'ami

Following Uthman's assassination, Ali was elected as caliph by the provincial rebels and the townspeople of Medina. He transferred the capital to Kufa, a garrison city in Iraq. Soon thereafter, Ali dismissed several provincial governors, some of whom were relatives of Uthman, and replaced them with trusted companions. Key appointments included Qays ibn Sa'd to Egypt and Uthman ibn Hunayf to Basra, while Abd Allah ibn Abbas was later appointed to oversee the administration of Basra following the Battle of the Camel.

Determined to avenge the assassination of Caliph Uthman, a rebel army led by Talha, Zubayr, and the widow of Muhammad, Aisha, set out towards Basra. Subsequently, Ali's army met the rebels at the Battle of the Camel. Ali emerged victorious, while Talha was killed during the fighting and Zubayr was assassinated shortly after withdrawing from the battlefield. Ali then tasked Aisha's half-brother, Muhammad ibn Abi Bakr, to escort her back to Medina.

Subsequently, another demand arose to avenge Uthman's murder, this time by Uthman's cousin and the Umayyad governor of Syria, Mu'awiya ibn Abi Sufyan. Ali's Iraqi army fought Mu'awiya's Syrian forces at the Battle of Siffin to a stalemate and an inconclusive arbitratuon. The process ended in a political deadlock after the arbiter, Amr ibn al-As, outmaneuvered his counterpart to favor Mu'awiya's claim. Following this, Ali was forced to fight the Battle of Nahrawan against the Kharijites, a faction of his former supporters who opposed both Ali and Mu'awiya due to their dissatisfaction with the arbitration. Weakened by this internal rebellion and a lack of popular support in many provinces, Ali's forces lost control over most of the caliphate's territory to Mu'awiya, who was formally recognized as caliph in 660 by his Syrian Arab tribal allies at a ceremony in Jerusalem.

In 661, Ali was assassinated by the Kharijite dissident Abd al-Rahman ibn Muljam. Ali's eldest son Hasan briefly succeeded him for six months before reaching an agreement to abdicate the caliphate to Mu'awiya. The treaty stated that Mu'awiya would not name a successor during his reign and that he would let a council choose the next leader. Mu'awiya then entered Kufa and received the pledge of allegiance from the Iraqis, resulting in the establishment of the Umayyad Caliphate, which supplanted the Rashidun Caliphate.

== Historiography ==
The histories were written "a posteriori" in the form of "founding conquest stories" based on nostalgia for the golden age in Abbasid times. Humphrey, quoted by Antoine Borrut, explains that the chronicles related to this period were created according to a pact-betrayal-redemption principle. A similar state of uncertainty arises in genealogy (and maybe in other people's tags) as well; modern historians do not accept genealogies from the pre-Islamic and early Islamic periods as verifiable information. Genealogies were oral products of the ayyām (Days of the Arabs) culture, which was established in Bedouin and semi-Bedouin Arab communities, as part of other traditional narrative forms based on lineage boasting. This form of transmission is one in which narratives are transmitted in a flexible manner, reshaped according to the social expectations present in each performance and the interaction between the narrator and the listener.

Early Islamic archaeology offers no evidence of a developed Islamic identity during this period. Unlike prominent historical figures of the period such as Mu'awiya I and Abd Allah ibn al-Zubayr, no archaeological evidence such as coins, seals, rock inscriptions, tombstones, etc., has been found that could indicate a "new Islamic rhetoric" (Note: There was no specific Islamic-religious identity and political stance with sharp boundaries in the early Islamic period.) predating Abd al-Malik or a political hegemonic state in the name of the four caliphs. In the collections of Islamic literature, a tradition of "letter writing" can be found under the categories of Maktubat (collected letters), Risalat (epistles or treatises), etc. and a large number of letters, which have need to be historically verified, are attributed to notable early Islamic figures including Umar as well as Muhammad and continue to be the subject of various religious-legal studies. Stories and speeches written in the name of Muhammad, Umar, (Note: Different versions of the text Pact of Umar identify different addressees. Some are directed to Umar, while others address Muslim generals, such as Abu Ubayda. Cohen notes that, although the Pact attributed to Umar I, "no text of the document can be dated earlier than the tenth or eleventh century.") or Ali (Note: Nahj al-balāgha (Arabic: نَهْج ٱلْبَلَاغَة, lit. 'the path of eloquence') is the best-known collection of sermons, letters, and sayings attributed to Ali ibn Abi Talib (d. 661), the fourth Rashidun caliph (r. 656–661), the first Shia imam, and the cousin and son-in-law of the Islamic prophet Muhammad. The compilation of the book is often credited to Sharif al-Radi (d. 1015), a prominent Shia scholar.) are compilations dating from centuries after the period in which they are believed to have lived.

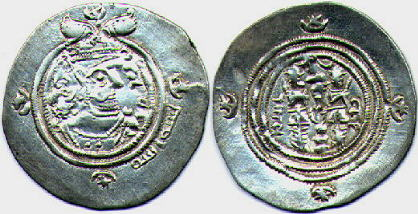
Sasanid style coins during the Rashidun period, featuring a crescent-star, fire altar, depictions of Khosrow II, and an Arabic bismillāh in the margin).

However, at least one inscription has been found dating to the period that mentions Umar ibn al-Khattab by name and the date of his death, known as the inscription of Zuhayr. Its three lines read:

1. In the name of God
2. I, Zuhayr, wrote (this) at the time Umar died, year four
3. And twenty

One of the rare archaeological findings from the early Islamic period; transcription of an undated rock inscription found in Saudi Arabia in 2012, without definitions such as Caliph or Amir al-Mu'minin, claimed to be Umar's signature

Robert G. Hoyland, finds it "all but certain" that the inscription refers to the historical Umar ibn al-Khattab, adding, "and yet the absence of any epithet or title is striking". Inscriptions may be susceptible to alternative readings due to the erasure of letters by environmental influences and inadequate writing systems, and unless specifically stated, dating can only be done approximately based on the "writing style". Other possible mentions in inscriptions from that era could be read as from Uthman ibn Affan include: an inscription at Tayma, Saudi Arabia, and one at the Alia Palace archaeological site in Makkah Province, Saudi Arabia. According to Tom Holland, Umar's historicity is beyond dispute. An Armenian bishop writing a decade or so after Qadisiyya describes Umar as a "mighty potentate coordinating the advance of the sons of Ismael from the depths of the desert". (Note: Tom Holland writes "What added incomparably to his prestige, was that his earth-shaking qualities as a generalissimo were combined with the most distinctive cast of virtues. Rather than ape the manner of a Caesar, as the Ghassanid kings had done, he drew on the example of a quite different kind of Christian. Umar's threadbare robes, his diet of bread, salt and water, and his rejection of worldly riches would have reminded anyone from the desert reaches beyond Palestine of a very particular kind of person. Monks out in the Judaean desert had long been casting themselves as warriors of God. The achievement of Umar was to take such language to a literal and previously unimaginable extreme.") Undeniable gaps between individuals' historical identity and their narrative identity and life stand before historians as indisputable realities.

== Military expansion ==
The Rashidun Caliphate expanded rapidly; within the span of 24 years, a vast territory was conquered comprising Mesopotamia, the Levant, parts of Anatolia, and most of the Sasanian Empire. Some explanations for the success of the Arab invasion of the empires to the north, west and east initiated by the Rashidun were the weakening of the two empires brought on by wars between them (especially the Byzantine–Sasanian War of 602–628), and by the Plague of Justinian, which crippled both states. Arab tribes had served as mercenaries for both empires in decades prior to the invasion and that experience gave them valuable military tactical skills and familiarity with the battlefields they would fight on against the two empires.

Despite the weakened condition of the Byzantine and Sasanian empires, their military equipment and organization remained comparatively sophisticated. The Sasanian army in particular retained a strong tradition of heavily equipped cavalry, whose equipment could include helmets, mail armour, breastplates, lances, swords, bows, and horse armour. By comparison, Arab forces during the early Muslim conquests generally used simpler forms of protection, including leather or mail armour, while mobility remained an important characteristic of their warfare.

Prior to the invasion, a good number of Arab infiltrators known as musta 'riba, "self-styled Arabs", migrated into Syria, Palestine and Iraq. They shared Arab language and customs and "received the invaders with enthusiasm", sometimes joining the invaders' forces. The buffer states of the Lakhmids and Ghasanids that had protected the empires in earlier times had disappeared by the time of the invasion. Other factors include the Arab Bedouin love of raiding and plundering sedentary peoples; the willingness of Bedouin tribes to cease their time honored practice of raiding each other and obey the commands of Hijazi Muslim leaders; and perhaps most decisively the Islamic belief of the invaders that conquering the unbelievers' land was a holy war/jihad of the sword, and that the plunder taken by them was a divinely ordained reward for the invaders.

The Arab conquests began as raids against the neighboring sedentary empires but quickly escalated as the raiders discovered that Byzantines and Persians gave little resistance to their attacks.

=== Conquest of the Sasanian Empire ===
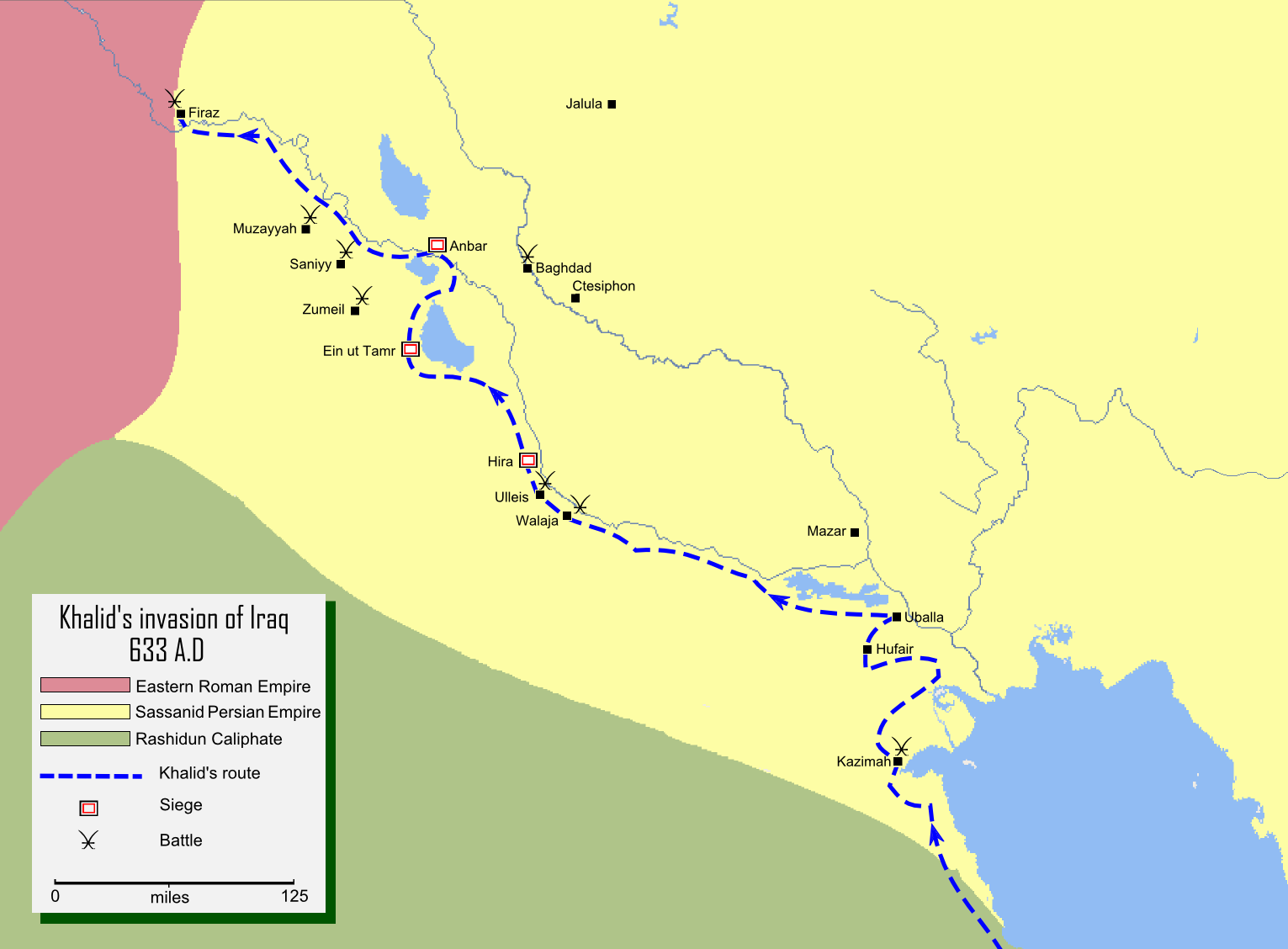
Map detailing the route of Khalid ibn al-Walid's conquest of Iraq

The first military move following the suppression of rebellions in Arabia was the invasion of the Sasanian Empire. In 633 Caliph Abu Bakr sent troops out to Sasanian-controlled Iraq, i.e. southern modern-day Iraq. Abu Bakr sent his general, Khalid ibn al-Walid, to conquer Mesopotamia after the Ridda wars. After entering Iraq with his army of 18,000, Khalid won decisive victories in four consecutive battles: the Battle of Chains, fought in April 633; the Battle of River, fought in the third week of April 633; the Battle of Walaja, fought in May 633 (where he successfully used a pincer movement), and the Battle of Ullais, fought in mid-May of 633. In the last week of May 633, the capital city of Iraq fell to the Muslims after initial resistance in the Battle of Hira.

After resting his armies, Khalid moved in June 633 towards Anbar, which resisted and was defeated, and eventually surrendered after a siege of a few weeks in July 633. Khalid then moved towards the south and conquered Ayn al-Tamr in the last week of July 633. By now, almost the whole of Iraq was under Islamic control. Khalid received a call for help from Dumat al-Jandal in Northern Arabia, where another Muslim general, Iyad ibn Ghanm, was trapped among the rebel tribes. Khalid diverted there and defeated the rebels in the Battle of Dawmat al-Jandal in the last week of August 633. Returning from Arabia, he received news that a large Persian army was assembling. Within a few weeks, he decided to defeat them piecemeal in order to avoid the risk of defeat by a large unified Persian army. Four divisions of Persian and Christian Arab auxiliaries were present at Hanafiz, Zumiel, Sanni, and Muzieh.

In November 633, Khalid divided his army into three units and attacked these auxiliaries one by one from three different sides at night, starting with the Battle of Muzayyah, then the Battle of Saniyy, and finally the Battle of Zumail. These devastating defeats ended Persian control over Iraq. In December 633, Khalid reached the border city of Firaz, where he defeated the combined forces of the Sasanian Persians, Byzantines and Christian Arabs in the Battle of Firaz. This was the last battle in his conquest of Iraq.

Khalid then left Mesopotamia to lead another campaign in Syria against the Byzantine Empire, after which Mithna ibn Haris took command in Mesopotamia. The Persians once again concentrated armies to regain Mesopotamia, while Mithna ibn Haris withdrew from central Iraq to the region near the Arabian desert to delay war until reinforcement came from Medina. Umar sent reinforcements under the command of Abu Ubayd al-Thaqafi. This army suffered a severe defeat from the Sasanian army in 634 at the Battle of the Bridge in which Abu Ubayd was killed, and Al-Muthanna saved the army from complete disaster by heroically defending a bridge over the Euphrates. The response was delayed until after a decisive Muslim victory against the Romans in the Levant at the Battle of Yarmouk in 636. Umar was then able to transfer forces to the east and resume the offensive against the Sasanians. Umar dispatched 36,000 men along with 7500 troops from the Syrian front, under the command of Sa'd ibn Abi Waqqas against the Persian army. The Battle of al-Qadisiyyah, the decisive battle of the campaign (near modern Najaf) followed, with the Persians prevailing at first, but, on the third day of fighting, the Muslims gained the upper hand. The legendary Persian general Rostam Farrokhzad was killed during the battle. According to some sources, the Persian losses were 20,000, and the Arabs lost 10,500 men.

Following this battle, the Arab Muslim armies pushed forward toward the Persian capital of Ctesiphon (also called Madā'in in Arabic), which was quickly evacuated by Yazdegerd III after a brief siege. After seizing the city, they continued their drive eastwards, following Yazdgird and his remaining troops as they attempted to regroup in the Zagros mountains. Within a short span of time, the Arab armies defeated a major Sasanian counterattack in the Battle of Jalula, as well as other engagements at Qasr-e Shirin, and Masabadhan. By the mid-7th century, the Arabs controlled all of Mesopotamia, including the area that is now the Iranian province of Khuzestan. It is said that Caliph Umar did not wish to send his troops through the Zagros Mountains and onto the Iranian plateau. One tradition has it that he wished for a "wall of fire" to keep the Arabs and Persians apart. Later commentators explain this as a common-sense precaution against over-extension of his forces. The Arabs had only recently conquered large territories that still had to be garrisoned and administered. The continued existence of the Persian government was, however, incitement to revolt in the conquered territories and unlike the Byzantine army, the Sasanian army was continuously striving to regain their lost territories. Finally, Umar pressed forward, which eventually resulted in the wholesale conquest of the Sasanian Empire. Yazdegerd, the Sasanian king, made yet another effort to regroup and defeat the invaders. By 641, he had raised a new force, which made a stand at the Battle of Nahavand, some forty miles south of Hamadan in modern Iran. The Rashidun army, under the command of Umar's appointed general Al-Nu'man ibn Muqrin, attacked and again defeated the Persian forces. The Muslims proclaimed it the Victory of Victories (Fath al-futuh), after which the Persians were unable to offer any effective resistance.

Though Yazdegerd was unable to raise another army, the invading Arabs advanced slowly because "distances were great, the population hostile, and towns and fortresses had to be captured one by one". Yazdegerd retreating east with a dwindling band of supporters, eventually to Khurasan where he was assassinated. In 642 Umar sent the army to conquer the remainder of the Persian Empire. The entirety of present-day Iran was conquered, followed by Greater Khorasan (which included the modern Iranian Khorasan province and modern Afghanistan), Transoxania, Balochistan and Makran (part of modern-day Pakistan), Azerbaijan, Dagestan, Armenia and Georgia; these regions were later re-conquered during Uthman's reign with further expansion into the regions which were not conquered during Umar's reign; hence, the Rashidun Caliphate's frontiers in the east extended to the lower Indus River and north to the Oxus River.

=== Wars against the Byzantine Empire ===
Unlike the Sasanian Persians, the Byzantines after losing Syria, retreated back to Anatolia which was heavily fortified. As a result, they also lost Egypt to the invading Rashidun army, although the civil wars among the Muslims halted the war of conquest for many years, and this gave time for the Byzantine Empire to recover.

==== Conquest of Byzantine Syria ====
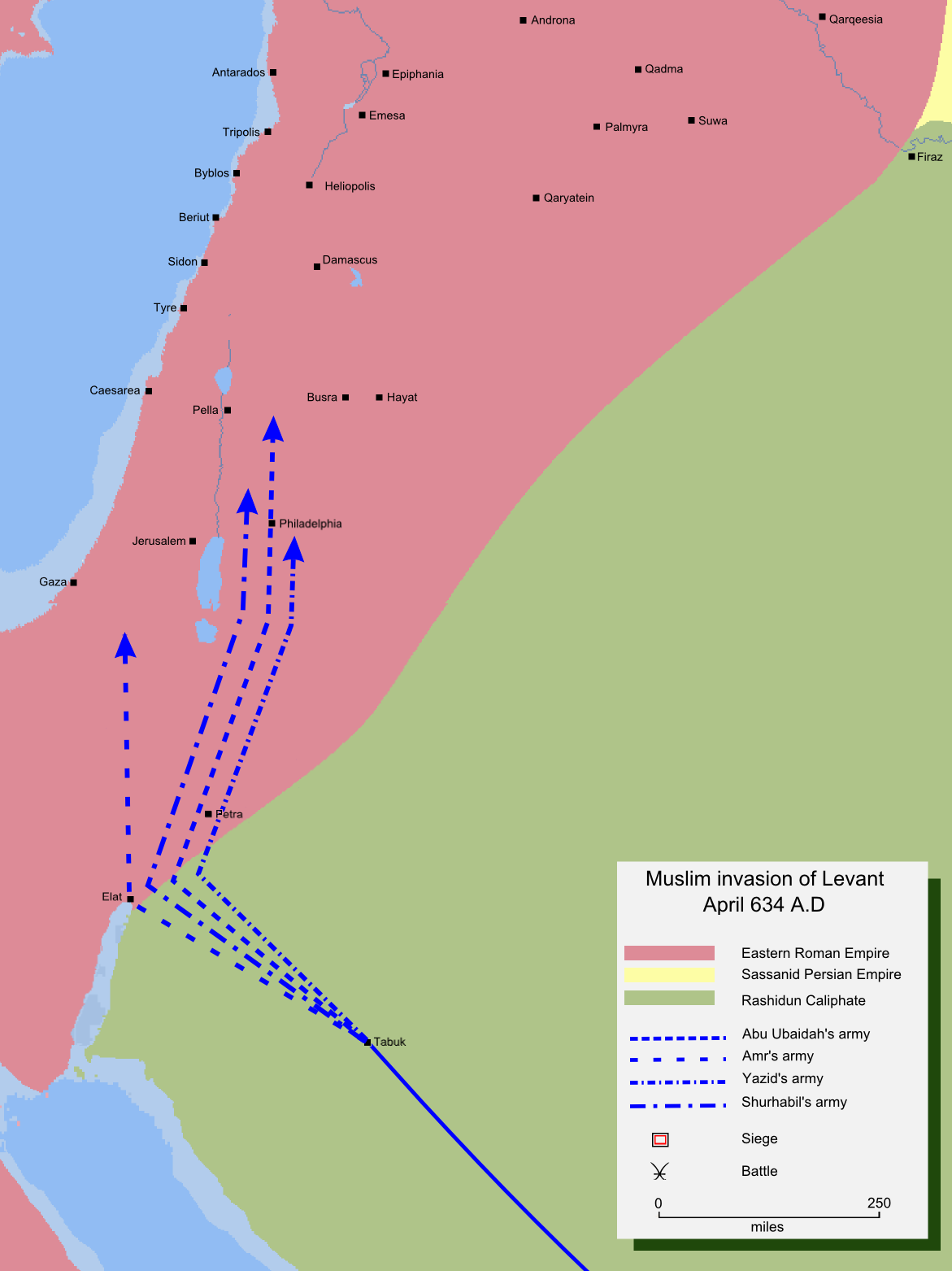
Map detailing the Rashidun Caliphate's invasion of the Levant

Topographical and strategic map of the Battle of Yarmouk (636 AD), depicting key locations, Roman and Muslim troop positions, roads, rivers, and terrain features. Based on historical sources, including Syvänne (2019), Kaegi (1992), and GIS data. Rashidun Army Current boundary Byzantine army Yarmuk River

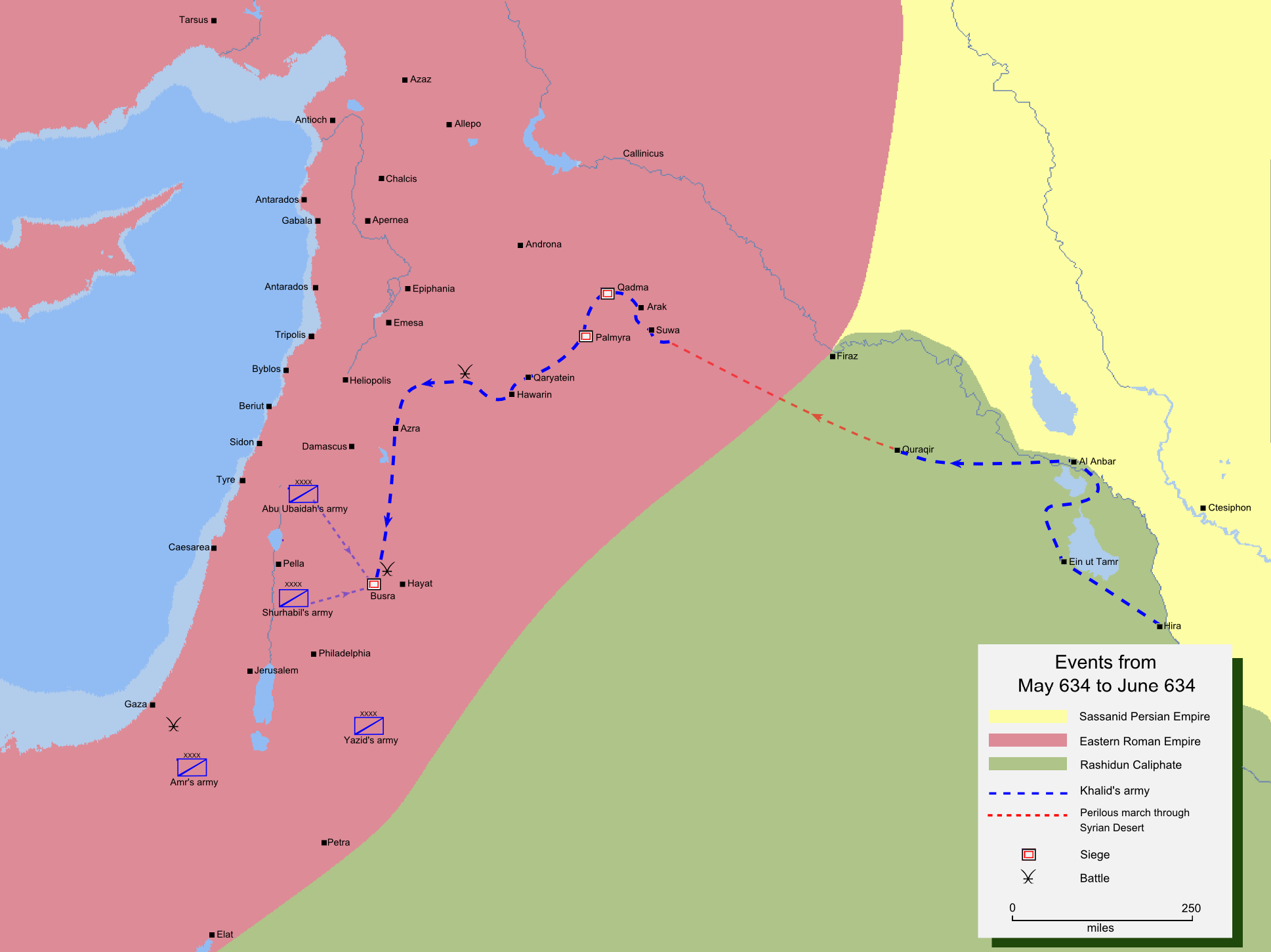
Map detailing the route of Khalid ibn al-Walid's invasion of Syria

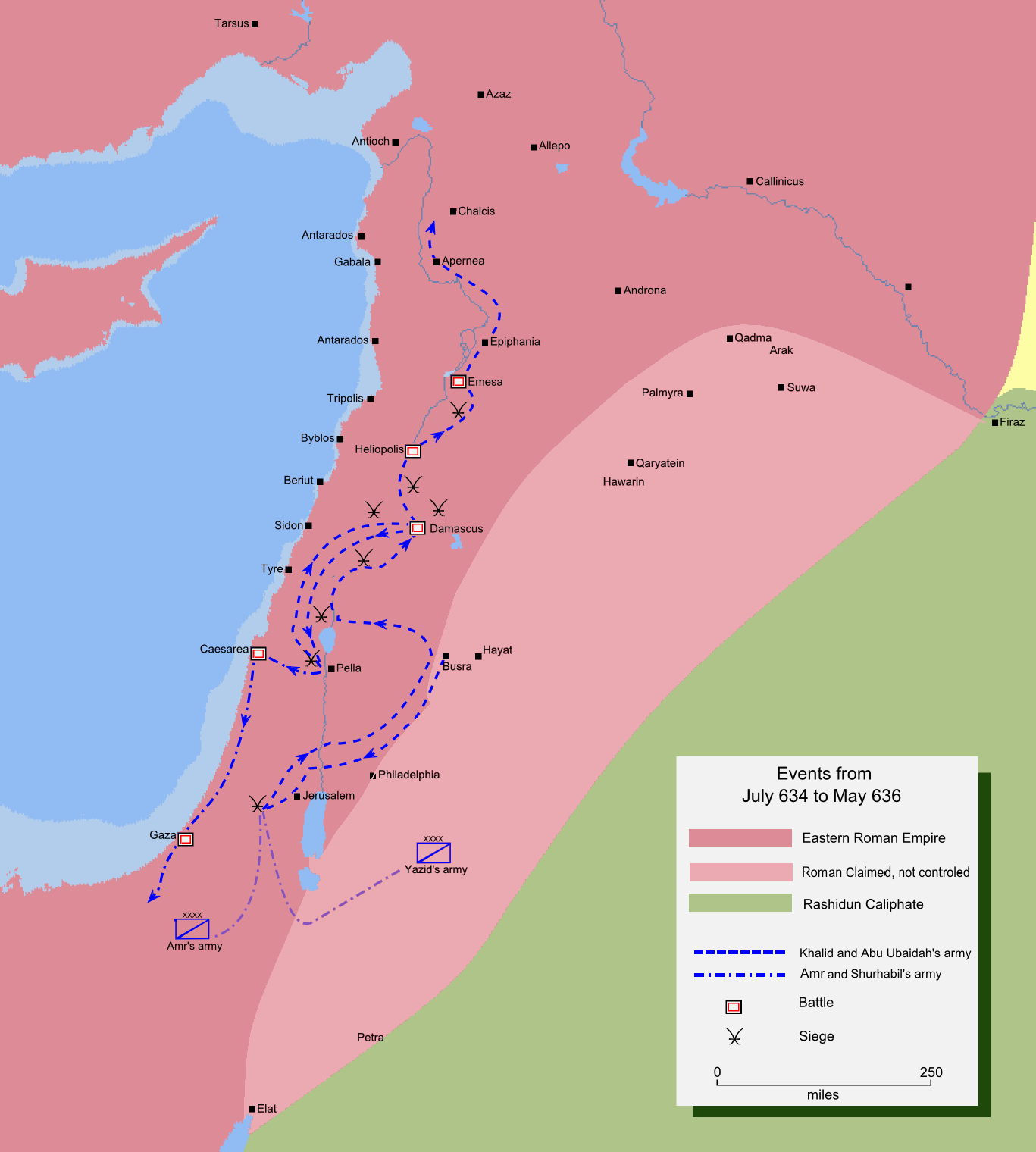
Map detailing the route of the Muslim invasion of central Syria

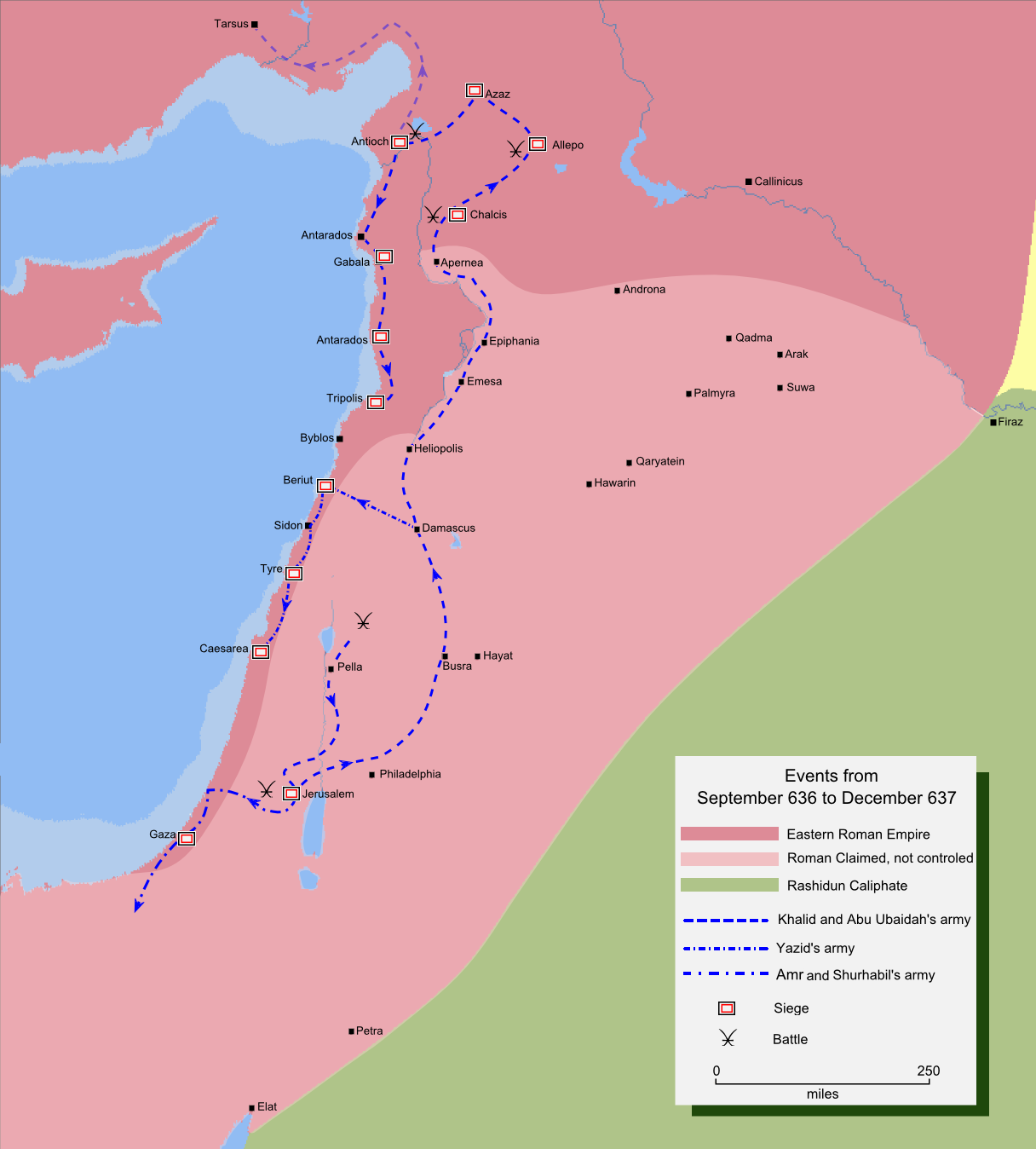
Map detailing the route of the Muslim invasion of northern Syria

After Khalid ibn al-Walid consolidated his control of Iraq, Abu Bakr sent four armies to Syria on the Byzantine front under four different commanders: Abu Ubayda ibn al-Jarrah (acting as their supreme commander), Amr ibn al-As, Yazid ibn Abi Sufyan and Shurahbil ibn Hasana. However, their advance was halted by a concentration of the Byzantine army at Ajnadayn. Abu Ubayda then sent for reinforcements. Abu Bakr ordered Khalid, who by now was planning to attack Ctesiphon, to march from Iraq to Syria with half his army. There were 2 major routes to Syria from Iraq, one passing through Mesopotamia and the other through Dumat al-Jandal. Khalid took an unconventional route through the Syrian Desert, and after a perilous march of 5 days, appeared in north-western Syria.

The border forts of Sawa, Arak, Tadmur, Sukhnah, al-Qaryatayn and Hawarin were the first to fall to the invading Muslims. Khalid marched on to Bosra via the Damascus road. At Bosra, the corps of Abu Ubayda and Shurahbil joined Khalid, upon which, per Abu Bakr's orders, Khalid assumed overall command from Abu Ubayda. Bosra, caught unprepared, surrendered after a brief siege in July 634 (see Battle of Bosra), effectively ending the dynasty of the Ghassanids.

From Bosra, Khalid sent orders to the other corps commanders to join him at Ajnadayn, where, according to early Muslim historians, a Byzantine army of 90,000 (modern sources state 9,000) was concentrated to push back the Muslims. The Byzantine army was defeated decisively on 30 July 634 in the Battle of Ajnadayn. It was the first major pitched battle between the Muslims and Byzantines and cleared the way for the former to capture central Syria. Damascus, the Byzantine stronghold, was conquered shortly after on 19 September 634. The Byzantine army was given a deadline of 3 days to flee as far as they could, with their families and treasure, or simply agree to stay in Damascus and pay tribute. After the three days had passed, the Muslim cavalry, under Khalid's command, attacked the Roman army by catching up to them using an unknown shortcut at the Battle of Marj al-Dibaj.

On 22 August 634, Abu Bakr died, making Umar his successor. Umar replaced Khalid with Abu Ubayda ibn al-Jarrah as overall commander of the Muslim armies, though Khalid continuing play an important part in the conquests under Abu Ubayda. The conquest of Syria slowed down under Abu Ubayda while he relied heavily on the advice of Khalid, who he kept close at hand.

The last large garrison of the Byzantine army was at Fahl, which was joined by survivors of Ajnadayn. With this threat at their rear, the Muslim armies could not move further north nor south. Thus Abu Ubayda decided to deal with the situation and defeated and routed this garrison at the Battle of Fahl on 23 January 635, which proved to be the "Key to Palestine". After this battle Abu Ubayda and Khalid marched north towards Emesa; Yazid was stationed in Damascus while Amr and Shurahbil marched south to capture Palestine.

While the Muslims were at Fahl, sensing the weak defense of Damascus, Emperor Heraclius sent an army to re-capture the city. This army, however, could not make it to Damascus and was intercepted by Abu Ubayda and Khalid on their way to Emesa. The army was destroyed in the Battle of Marj ar-Rum and the second battle of Damascus. Emesa and the strategic town of Chalcis made peace with the Muslims for one year in order to buy time for Heraclius to prepare his defenses and raise new armies. The Muslims welcomed the peace and consolidated their control over the conquered territory. However, as soon as the Muslims received the news of reinforcements being sent to Emesa and Chalcis, they marched against Emesa, laid siege to it and eventually captured the city in March 636.

The prisoners taken in the battle informed them about Emperor Heraclius's plans to take back Syria. They said that an army possibly 200,000 strong would soon emerge to recapture the province. Khalid stopped here on June 636. As soon as Abu Ubayda heard the news of the advancing Byzantine army, he gathered all his officers to plan their next move. Khalid suggested that they should consolidate all of their forces present in the province of Syria (Syria, Jordan, Palestine) and then move towards the plain of Yarmouk for battle.

Abu Ubayda ordered the Muslim commanders to withdraw from all the conquered areas, return the tributes they had previously gathered, and move towards Yarmouk. Heraclius's army also moved towards Yarmouk, but the Muslim armies reached it in early July 636, a week or two before the Byzantines. Khalid's mobile guard defeated the Christian Arab auxiliaries of the Roman army in a skirmish.

In the third week of August, the Battle of the Yarmuk was fought, resulting in the whole of Syria falling into Muslim hands. The battle lasted 6 days during which Abu Ubayda transferred the command of the entire army to Khalid. Outnumbered five-to-one, the Muslims nevertheless defeated the Byzantine army in October 636. Abu Ubayda held a meeting with his high command officers, including Khalid, to decide on future conquests, settling on Jerusalem. The siege of Jerusalem led to great hunger but it negotiated a treaty of surrender with Umar with very generous terms. Christians were promised protection, freedom of worship, that churches would not be turned into mosques, and a tax less heavy than what they had paid Byzantium. Jerusalem surrendered in April 637 and Caliph Umar's appearance wearing a coarse robe made a strong impression on Jerusalemites accustomed to Byzantine splendor. He allowed the Church of the Holy Sepulchre to remain and prayed on a prayer rug outside of the church.

Abu Ubayda sent Amr ibn al-As, Yazid ibn Abi Sufyan, and Shurahbil ibn Hasana back to their areas to reconquer them; most submitted without a fight. Abu Ubayda himself, along with Khalid, moved to northern Syria to reconquer it with a 17,000-man army. Khalid, along with his cavalry, was sent to Hazir and Abu Ubayda moved to the city of Qinnasrin.

Khalid defeated a strong Byzantine army at the Battle of Hazir and reached Qinnasrin before Abu Ubayda. The city surrendered to Khalid, and soon after, Abu Ubayda arrived in June 637. Abu Ubayda then moved against Aleppo, with Khalid commanding the cavalry as usual. After the Battle of Aleppo the city finally agreed to surrender in October 637.

==== Occupation of Anatolia ====
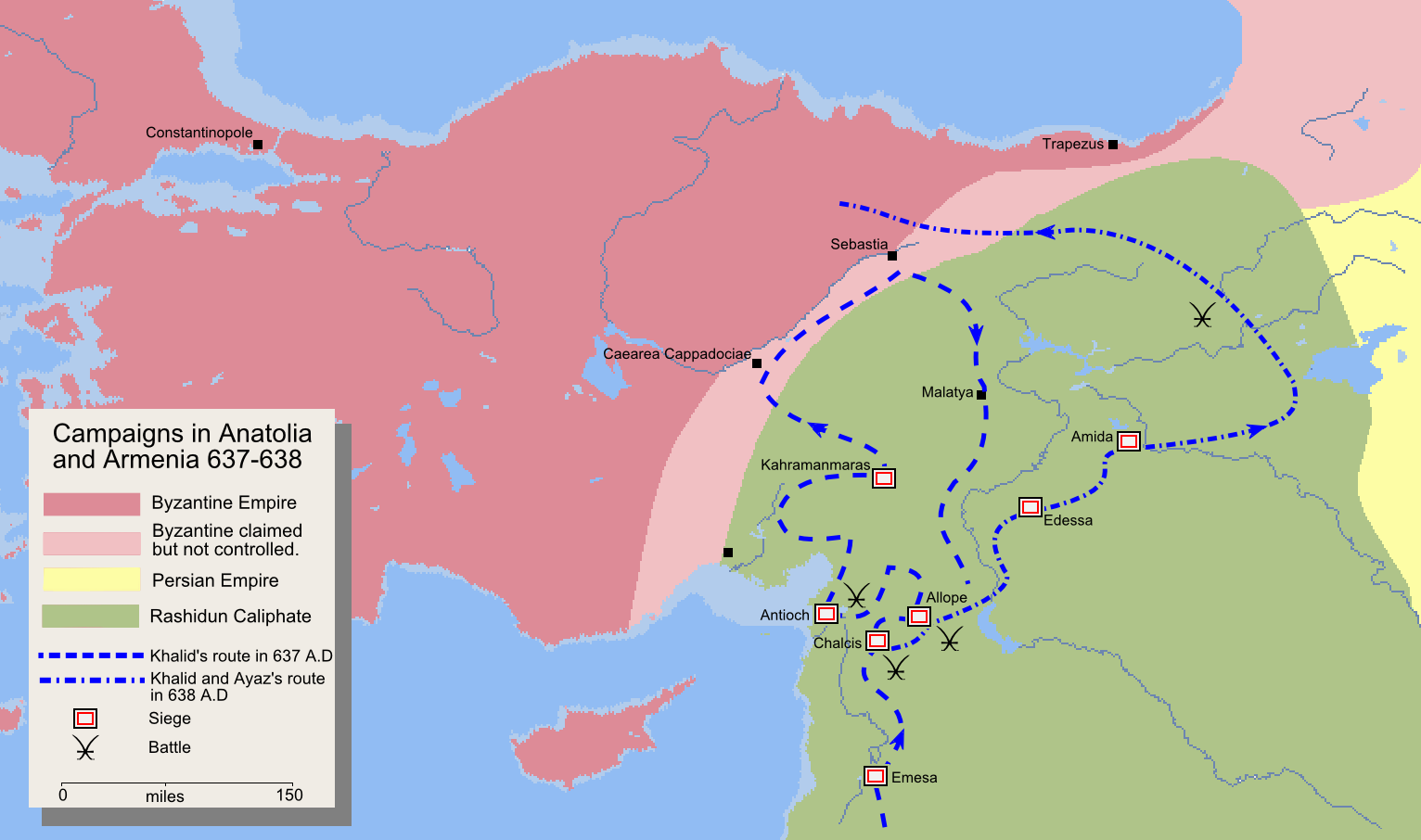
Map detailing the route of Khalid ibn al-Walid's invasion of Eastern Anatolia and Armenia

In the mountains of Asia Minor, the Muslims enjoyed less success, with the Byzantines adopting the tactic of "guerilla warfare", refusing to give battle to the Muslims, while the people retreated into castles and fortified towns when the Muslims invaded; instead, Byzantine forces ambushed Muslim raiders as they returned to Syria carrying plunder and slaves.

Abu Ubayda and Khalid ibn al-Walid, after conquering all of northern Syria, moved north towards Anatolia taking the fort of Azaz to clear the flank and rear of Byzantine troops. On their way to Antioch, a Roman army blocked them near a river on which there was an iron bridge. Because of this, the following battle is known as the Battle of the Iron Bridge. The Muslim army defeated the Byzantines and Antioch surrendered on 30 October 637 AD. Later during the year, Abu Ubayda sent Khalid and Iyad ibn Ghanm at the head of two separate armies against the western part of Jazira, most of which was conquered without strong resistance, including parts of Anatolia, Edessa and the area up to the Ararat Plain. Other columns were sent to Anatolia as far west as the Taurus Mountains, the important city of Marash, and Malatya, which were all conquered by Khalid in the autumn of 638. During Uthman's reign, the Byzantines recaptured many forts in the region and on Uthman's orders, a series of campaigns were launched to regain control of them. In 647, the governor of Syria Mu'awiya ibn Abi Sufyan launched an expedition into Anatolia, invading Cappadocia and attacking Caesarea Mazaca. In 648 the Rashidun army raided Phrygia. A major offensive into Cilicia and Isauria in 650–651 forced the Byzantine Emperor Constans II to enter into negotiations with Mu'awiya. The truce that followed allowed a short respite and made it possible for Constans II to hold on to the western portions of Armenia. In 654–655, on the orders of Uthman, an expedition prepared to attack Constantinople, but this plan was not carried out due to the civil war that broke out in 656.

The Muslim advance north was stopped by the barrier of the Nur Mountains. The Taurus Mountains in Turkey marked the western frontiers of the Rashidun Caliphate in Anatolia during Caliph Uthman's reign. In the frontier area where Anatolia met Syria, the Byzantine state evacuated the entire population and laid waste to the countryside, creating a no man's land where any invading army would find no food. For decades afterwards, a guerrilla war was waged by Christians in the hilly countryside of north-western Syria supported by the Byzantines. At the same time, the Byzantines began a policy of launching raids via sea on the coast of the caliphate with the aim of forcing the Muslims to keep at least some of their forces to defend their coastlines, thus limiting the number of troops available for an invasion of Anatolia. Unlike Syria with its plains and deserts, which favored the offensive, the mountainous terrain of Anatolia favored the defensive, and for centuries afterwards the line between Christian and Muslim lands ran along the border between Anatolia and Syria.

==== Conquest of Egypt ====
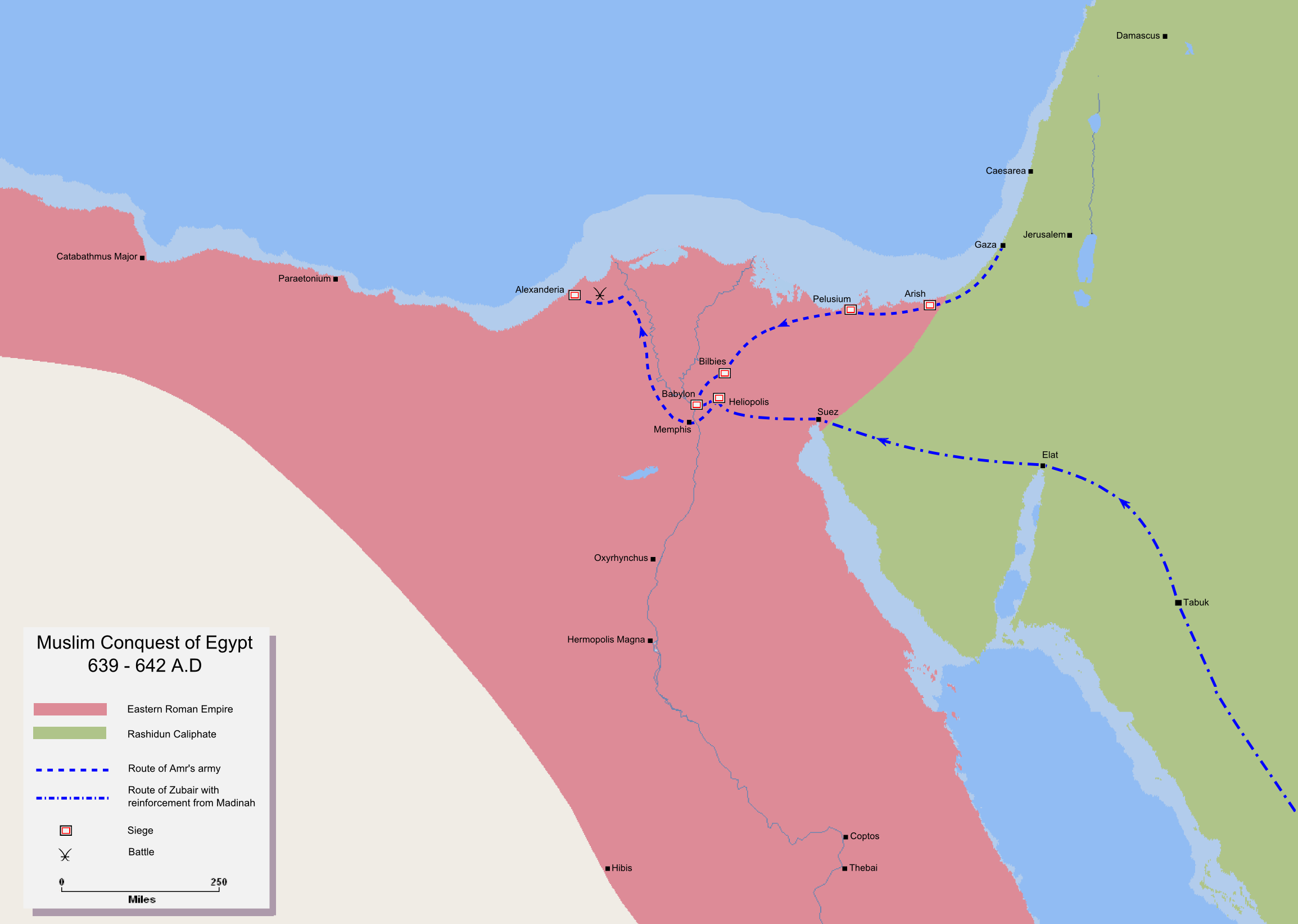
Map detailing the route of the Muslim invasion of Egypt

The Byzantine province of Egypt held strategic importance for its grain production, naval yards, and as a base for further conquests in Africa. Possessing some of the most productive and fertile farmland in the entire world, the Nile Delta made Egypt the "granary" of the Byzantine empire. Control of it meant that the caliphate could weather droughts without the fear of famine. In 639, Egypt was a prefecture of the Byzantine Empire but had been occupied just a decade before by the Sasanian Empire under Khosrau II (616 to 629). The power of the Byzantine Empire was shattered during the Muslim conquest of Syria, and therefore the conquest of Egypt was much easier.

The Muslim general Amr ibn al-As began the conquest of the province on his own initiative in 639. The majority of the Byzantine forces in Egypt were locally raised Coptic forces, intended to serve more as a police force; since the vast majority of Egyptians lived in the Nile River valley, surrounded on both the eastern and western sides by desert, Egypt was felt to be a relatively secure province.

In December 639, Amr entered the Sinai with a large force and took Pelusium, on the edge of the Nile River valley, and then defeated a Byzantine counter-attack at Bilbeis.

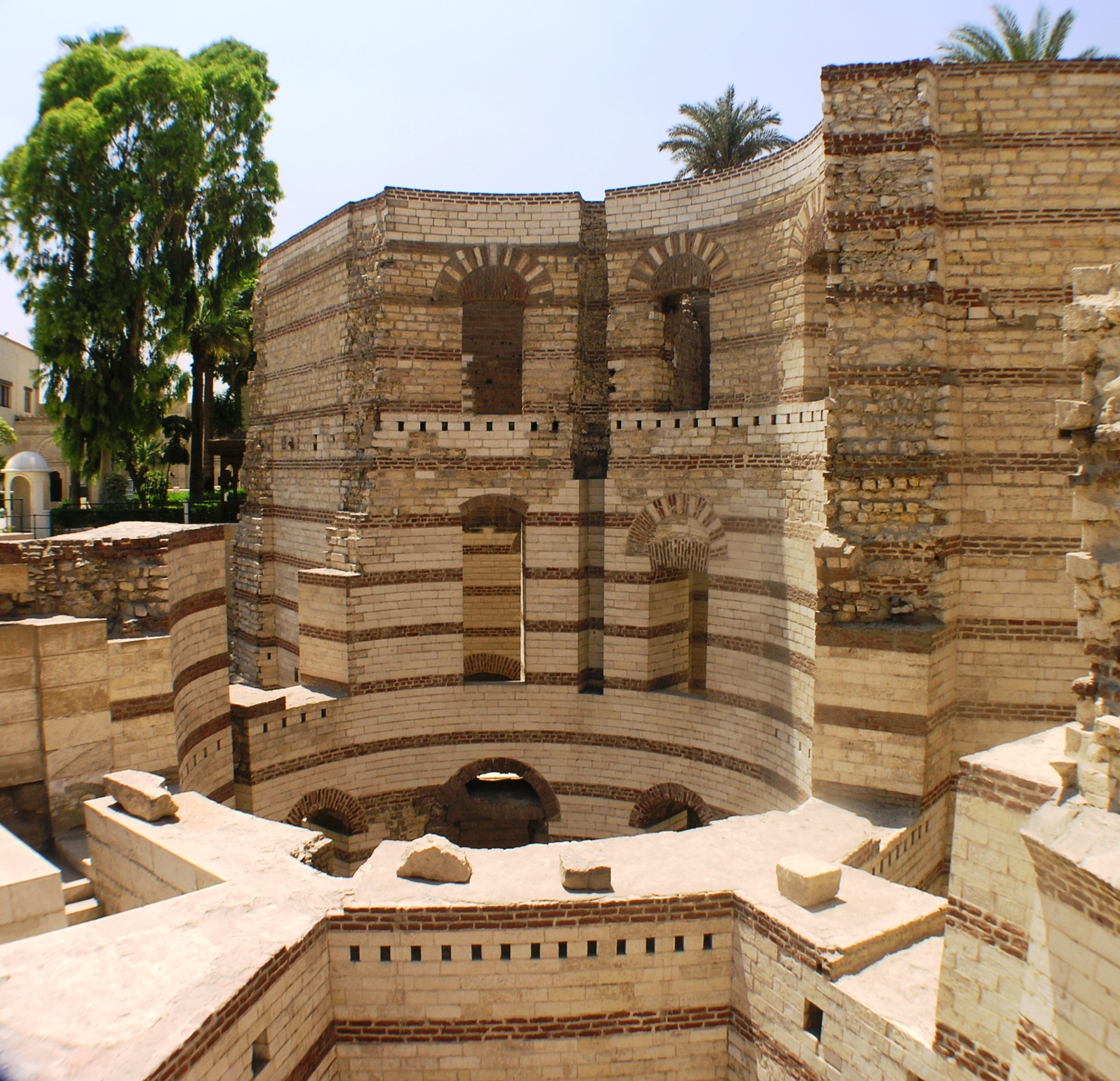
Remains of Babylon Fortress in Egypt today, the Roman/Byzantine fortress that occupied the site of what is now Old Cairo

Contrary to expectations, the Arabs did not head for Alexandria, the capital of Egypt, but instead for a major fortress known as Babylon located at what is now Cairo. They advanced rapidly into the Nile Delta. The imperial garrisons retreated into the walled towns, where they successfully held out for a year or more. Amr was planning to divide the Nile River valley in two. The Arab forces won a major victory at the Battle of Heliopolis in 640, cleverly luring Byzantine forces away from the Babylon Fortress.

However, Amr found it difficult to advance further because major cities in the Nile Delta were protected by water and because Amr lacked the machinery to break down city fortifications. Amr next proceeded towards Alexandria, which was surrendered to him by a treaty signed on 8 November 641. The Thebaid seems to have surrendered with scarcely any opposition.

The ease with which this valuable province was wrenched from the Byzantine Empire is said to have been due to the treachery of Cyrus, prefect of Egypt and Patriarch of Alexandria, and the incompetence of the Byzantine generals, as well as the loss of most of the Byzantine troops in Syria. Cyrus had persecuted the local Coptic Christians. He was one of the advocates of monothelitism, a 7th-century Christian heresy, and some have accused him of having been a secret convert to Islam.

In 645, during Uthman's reign, the Byzantines briefly regained Alexandria, but it was retaken by Amr in 646. In 654 an invasion fleet sent by Constans II was repulsed. After this, no serious effort was made by the Byzantines to regain possession of the country. The Muslims were assisted by some Copts, who found the Muslims more tolerant than the Byzantines, and of these, some turned to Islam. In return for a tribute of money and food for the occupation troops, the Christian inhabitants of Egypt were excused from military service and left free in the observance of their religion and the administration of their affairs. Others sided with the Byzantines, hoping that they would provide a defense against the Arab invaders.

==== Conquest of the Maghreb ====
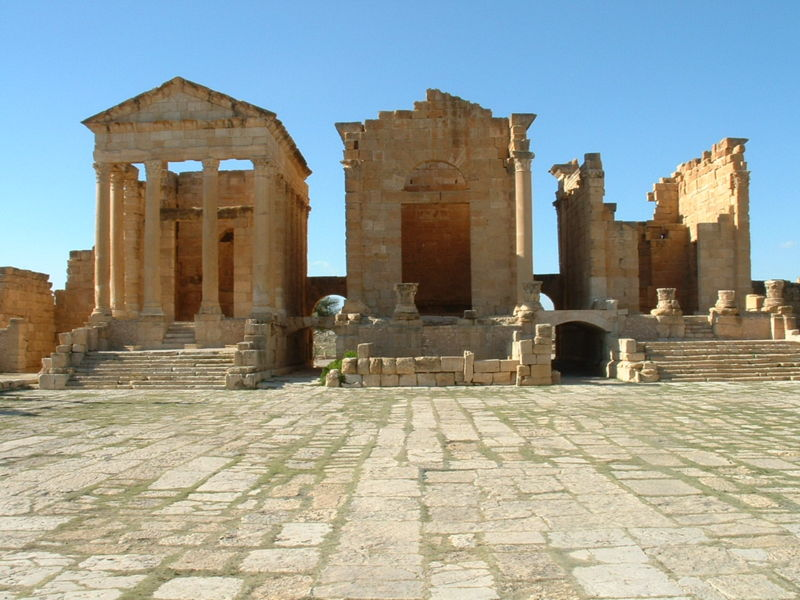
The Roman ruins of Sbeitla (Sufetula), present-day Tunisia

After the withdrawal of the Byzantines from Egypt, the Exarchate of Africa (i.e. that part of Byzantine North Africa west of Egypt), under its exarch (governor), Gregory the Patrician declared its independence. Abd Allah ibn Sa'd sent raiding parties to the west, resulting in considerable plunder and encouraging him to propose a campaign to conquer the Exarchate, which Uthman approved. A force of 10,000 soldiers was sent as reinforcement. The Rashidun army assembled in Cyrenaica, and from there marched west, first capturing Tripoli, and then Sufetula, Gregory's capital. In the ensuing battle in 647, the Exarchate was defeated and Gregory was killed due to the superior tactics of Abd Allah ibn al-Zubayr. Afterward, the people of North Africa sued for peace, agreeing to pay an annual tribute. Instead of annexing North Africa, the Muslims preferred to make North Africa a vassal state, fearing a counter offensive. When the stipulated amount of the tribute was paid, the Muslim forces withdrew to Barqa. Following the First Fitna, the first Muslim civil war, Muslim forces withdrew from North Africa to Egypt. The Umayyad Caliphate would later re-invade North Africa in 664.

==== Campaign against Nubia (Sudan) ====
A campaign was undertaken against Nubia during the Caliphate of Umar in 642, but failed after the Makurians won the First Battle of Dongola. The Muslim army pulled out of Nubia with nothing to show for it. Ten years later, Uthman's governor of Egypt, Abdullah ibn Saad, sent another army to Nubia. This army penetrated deeper into Nubia and laid siege to the Nubian capital of Dongola. The Muslims damaged the cathedral in the center of the city, but Makuria also won this battle. As the Muslims were unable to overpower Makuria, they negotiated a mutual non-aggression treaty with their king, Qalidurut. Each side also agreed to afford free passage to each other through their respective territories. Nubia agreed to provide 360 slaves to Egypt every year, while Egypt agreed to supply grain, horses, and textiles to Nubia according to demand.

==== Conquest of the islands of the Mediterranean Sea ====
During Caliph Umar's reign, the governor of Syria, Mu'awiya ibn Abi Sufyan, sent a request to build a naval force to invade the islands of the Mediterranean Sea but the proposal was rejected by Umar who believed that the risk to the soldiers was too great. Once Uthman became caliph however, he approved Mu'awiya's request. In 650, Mu'awiya attacked Cyprus, conquering the capital, Constantia, after a brief siege, but signed a treaty with the local rulers. During this expedition, a relative of Muhammad, Umm Haram, fell from her mule near the Salt Lake at Larnaca and was killed. She was buried in that same spot, which became a holy site for many local Muslims and Christians and in 1816, the Hala Sultan Tekke was built there by the Ottomans. After apprehending a breach of the treaty, the Arabs re-invaded the island in 654 with five hundred ships. This time, however, a garrison of 12,000 men was left in Cyprus, bringing the island under Muslim influence. After leaving Cyprus, the Muslim fleet headed towards Crete and then Rhodes and conquered them without much resistance. From 652 to 654, the Muslims launched a naval campaign against Sicily and captured a large part of the island. Soon after this, Uthman was murdered, ending his expansionist policy, and the Muslims accordingly retreated from Sicily. In 655 Byzantine Emperor Constans II led a fleet in person to attack the Muslims at Phoinike (off Lycia) but it was defeated: both sides suffered heavy losses in the battle, and the emperor himself narrowly avoided death.

=== Rashidun military ===
The Rashidun military was the primary arm of the Islamic armed forces of the 7th century, serving alongside the Rashidun navy. The army maintained a very high level of discipline, strategic prowess, and organization, along with the motivation and initiative of the officer corps. For much of its history, this army was one of the most powerful and effective military forces throughout the region. At the height of the Rashidun Caliphate, the maximum size of the army was around 100,000 troops.

==== Rashidun army ====
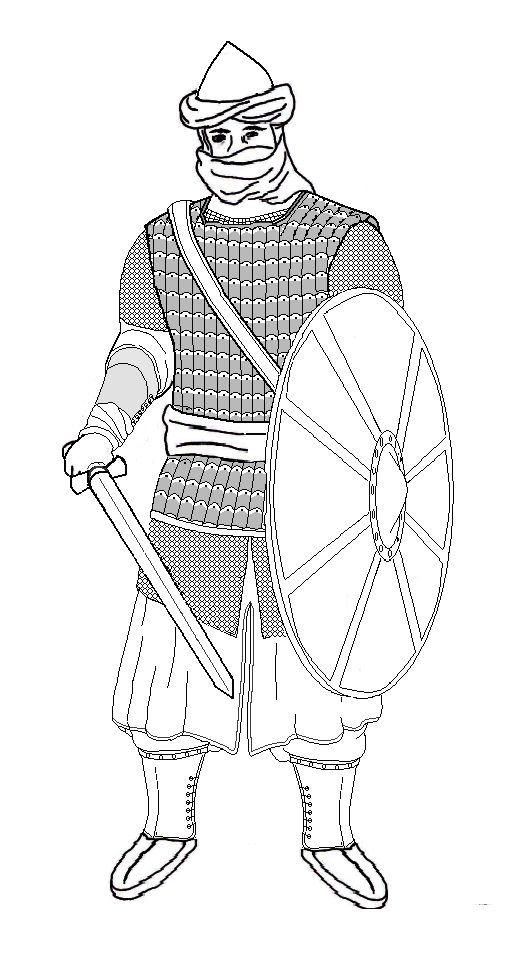
Rashidun soldier wears an iron-bronze helmet, a hauberk and lamellar leather armour. His sword is hung from a baldric, and he carries a leather shield.

The Rashidun army was divided into infantry and light cavalry. Reconstructing the military equipment of early Muslim armies is problematic. Compared with Roman armies or later medieval Muslim armies, the range of visual representation is very small, often imprecise. Physically, very little material evidence has survived, and much of it is difficult to date. The soldiers wore iron and bronze segmented helmets from Iraq, of Central Asian type.

The standard form of body armor was chainmail. There are also references to the practice of wearing two coats of mail (dir'ayn), the one under the main one being shorter or even made of fabric or leather. Hauberks and large wooden or wickerwork shields were also used as protection in combat. The soldiers were usually equipped with swords hung in a baldric. They also possessed spears and daggers. Umar was the first Muslim ruler to organize the army as a state department, in 637. A beginning was made with the Quraysh and the Ansar and the system was gradually extended to the whole of Arabia and to Muslims of conquered lands.

The basic strategy of early Muslim armies on the campaign was to exploit every possible weakness of the enemy. Their key strength was mobility. The cavalry had both horses and camels, the latter used as both transport and food for long marches through the desert (e.g., Khalid ibn al-Walid's extraordinary march from the Persian border to Damascus). The cavalry was the army's main strike force and also served as a strategic mobile reserve. The common tactic was to use the infantry and archers to engage and maintain contact with the enemy while the cavalry was held back till the enemy was fully engaged. Once fully engaged, the enemy reserves were held by the infantry and archers, while the cavalry executed a pincer movement (like modern tank and mechanized divisions) to attack the enemy from the sides or to assault their base camps.

The Rashidun army was, in quality and strength, below the standard set by the Sasanian and Byzantine armies. Khalid ibn al-Walid was the first general of the Rashidun Caliphate to successfully conquer foreign lands. During his campaign against the Sasanian Empire (Iraq, 633–634) and the Byzantine Empire (Syria, 634–638), Khalid developed brilliant tactics that he used effectively against both enemy armies.

Abu Bakr's strategy was to give his generals their mission, the geographical area in which that mission would be carried out, and resources for that purpose. He would then leave it to his generals to accomplish their missions in whatever manner they chose. In contrast, Caliph Umar, in the latter part of his Caliphate, adopted a more hands-on approach, directing his generals where to stay and when to move to the next target and who was to command the left and right wing of the army in each particular battle. This made conquests comparatively slower but made the campaigns well-organized. Uthman on the other hand reverted to Abu Bakr's method, giving missions to his generals and leaving the details to them.

==== Rashidun banners and standards ====
The Rashidun Caliphate utilized a dual system of military banners inherited from the prophetic era. According to tradition, Muhammad's flag (raya) was black, while his standard (liwa) was white.

- The Black Standard (al-rāyat as-sawdāʾ): Also known as the "Banner of the Eagle" (al-ʿuqāb)., it served as the primary military identification for the caliphate's armies. This banner gained significant eschatological weight in later Islamic history, though it was standard military equipment during the conquests.
- The White Banner (al-liwa al-abyad): This signified supreme military command and was often carried by the Caliph or the commander-in-chief of a campaign. At the Battle of Siffin, the Rashidun caliph Ali reportedly used the white liwa of Muhammad.

In addition to these central banners, tribal contingents carried their own distinct flags (rayat). During the caliphate of Umar, there was a concerted effort to centralize authority by assigning these tribal banners to veterans with "Islamic priority" (ahl al-sabiqa). Historically, these tribal banners varied in color; for example, the Kinda carried black, while the Ash'arīyün carried white with a black border.

==== Rashidun navy ====
The early caliphal navy managed to mark the beginning of a long time legacy of Islamic maritime enterprises from the Conquest of Cyprus, the famous Battle of the Masts up to the exploits of their successor states such as in the area located in between the Jihun River (Oxus/Amu Darya) and the Syr Darya in Transoxiana, to Sindh (present day Pakistan) by the Umayyad Caliphate, the naval core of privateers stationed at La Garde-Freinet by the Umayyad state of Córdoba, and the conquest of Sicily by the Aghlabid dynasty.

== Governance ==
The four Rashidun Caliphs (all companions of Muhammad) not only conquered large amounts of territory but established "a system of government" and formulated "political principles for the Muslim Community", according to Jebran Chamieh. Because they were the only true Muslim rulers who followed the teachings of Islam "in their purity", their example should be followed. Abdus Salam Nadvi sees piety and virtue as the common thread of the Rashidun.

=== Political theory or system ===
According to Chamieh, some of the distinctive features of the polity, that were sometimes followed by succeeding dynasties, were internal instability (as noted above, three of the four caliphs died by assassination), use of force rather than consultation (shura), calls for obedience to the Caliph enforced by coercion (as reflected in Abu Bakr's demand that followers hear and obey, and by his lieutenant Umar's threat against anyone who would oppose him); (Note: "Al-Tabari tells the story that Umar went to the house of Fatema, Muhammad's daughter, where Ali and leading Companions had gathered, and threatened to burn the house" down on them if they did "not pledge their allegiance".) often disregarding the advice of other companions; a privileged position for the Quraysh tribe, whose members were the only ones who could be caliphs, no police, providing autonomy to conquered imperial administrations by allowing them to continue operating under their own administration; the using of a bay'ah (pledge of obedience) from Muslims to legitimise the caliph's rule, but without formalising who the pledge-givers were to be and how many of them were needed to make the caliph's rule legitimate.

Abu Bakr and his ally Umar supported the domination of Arabs over non-Arabs and the Quraysh tribe over other Arab tribes, marginalizing the Ansar and the Hashemites due to their opposition to Abu Bakr and himself. Following Abu Bakr, Umar is said to have also used political and civil coercion to enforce his will.

=== Use of previous administrations ===
The conquests that begun under caliph Abu Bakr and expanded under caliph Umar resulted in an empire of vast size, covering a diversity of races, customs, and types of government.

To deal with this diversity, Caliph Umar allowed the local administration of occupied countries to carry on much as before, (according to scholar Laura Veccia Vaglieri), and confined himself to appointing a commander or governor (amir) with full powers, sometimes assisted by an agent (amil), responsible directly to the empire's capital in Medina, to take care of financial matters. He then kept a "tight rein" on these officials.

During his reign, Abu Bakr established the Bayt al-Mal (state treasury). Umar expanded the treasury and established a government building to administer the state finances. (Note: Some information about life under the Rashidun comes from The Ways of the Sahabah by Maulana Abdus Salam Nadvi, a work that according to a vender's blurb "depicts the life sketches and heroic deeds of the companions" and provides both a Historical document and "a source of inspiration for Muslims". Since the era of the companions coincides with that of the Rashidun (in addition to some decades before and after), the book is a source for not only (traditional claims of) the many virtues of the companions (humility, forbearance, justice, piety, fortitude, etc.) but also taxation and revenue, social welfare, public works, city populations, rights of slaves, etc. under the Rashidun.)

=== Choosing the caliph ===
According to historians Bosworth Marín and Ayalon, with the exception of Umar, who was nominated by Abu Bakr, the Rashidun caliphs were chosen by a small group of prominent members of the Quraysh tribe through shūrā (Arabic: شُـوْرَى, lit. 'consultation').

Journalist and historian Thomas W. Lippman describes the selection of Abu Bakr as being a choice of "insiders" who presented it to the Muslim community as a "fait accompli" and argues that this precedent and the failure to establish a "formal system" to select a caliph ensured that "difficulties would arise in the choice of later caliphs".

Fred Donner, in his book The Early Islamic Conquests (1981), describes that the standard Arabian practice followed during the early Caliphates were the prominent men of a kinship group or tribe, gathering after a leader's death and electing a leader from amongst themselves, although there was no specified procedure for the shura, or consultative assembly. Candidates were usually from the same lineage as the deceased leader, but they were not necessarily his sons. Capable men who would lead well were preferred over an ineffectual direct heir, as there was no basis in the majority Sunni view that the head of state or governor should be chosen based on lineage alone.

Two other historians (Wilferd Madelung and Jebran Chamieh) deny that the Rashidun caliphs used the shura and describe a more complicated process of selection.

Madelung writes that Abu Bakr, acting as a shrewd politician, ensuring his selection as Muhammad's successor by avoiding the use of a shura (because it "would have backed hereditary success"), "sidelining" the Ansar and early companions of Muhammad in favor of his supporters among the Meccan Quraysh. The next two Caliphs Umar and Uthman also had support of the Quraysh but would not have had that of the shura (according to Madelung). (Note: The Islamist group Hizb ut-Tahrir (HT) emphasizes the act of giving bayah (pledge) of obedience to the caliph, first by the leading Muslims who selected him and then by the Muslims in general. HT claims to model its plan for restoration of the caliphate on the rule of Muhammad and the Rashidun. For example, in its work "The Institutions of State in the Khilafah In Ruling and Administration", it recommends various government procedures, commenting after each one—"as was the case in the time of the Messenger (and the time of the Khulafaa' Rashidun".)

Chamieh writes that Umar, an ally of Abu Bakr during his election and rule over the caliphate, was appointed by Abu Bakr when he felt his death was near with the order: "Do you accept whom I have chosen for you? I have considered the question seriously and I have not chosen a relative of mine; my choice for you is Umar ibn al-Khattab, so hear and obey."

As Umar lay mortally wounded, he chose a committee of six companions to choose the next caliph from among them, adding his son to make a tie-breaking vote if one was needed. Five of six of this committee were related to Muhammad and were part of "the elite of the Muslim community". The committee ultimately choose Uthman over Ali.

While Chamieh believes that Umar fixed the committee to choose Uthman, Bernard Lewis describes Umar's process of appointing a shura as one "deemed" by Sunni Muslims as the "classic" way to choose a caliph, though it was not repeated for any other caliph.

=== Treatment of conquered peoples ===
The conquered people of the caliphate (the vast majority of the population) were non-Muslim. Those who were monotheists – Jews, Zoroastrians, and Christians – in conquered lands were called dhimmis (the protected people). Dhimmis were allowed to "practice their religion, and to enjoy a measure of communal autonomy" and were guaranteed their personal safety and security of property, but only in return for paying tax (jizya) and acknowledging Muslim rule.

The Rashidun caliphs had placed special emphasis on relatively fair and just treatment of the dhimmis which were also provided "protection" by the Caliphate and were not expected to fight as Muslims were. Sometimes, particularly when there were not enough qualified Muslims, dhimmis were allowed to hold important positions in the government. In the following decades Islamic jurists elaborated a legal framework in which other religions would have a protected but subordinate status. Islamic law followed the Byzantine precedent of classifying subjects of the state according to their religion, in contrast to the Sasanian model which put more weight on social than on religious distinctions. In theory, only monotheists could be dhimmi and severe restrictions were placed on paganism, as the Byzantine empire had. But in practice most non-Abrahamic communities of the former Sasanian territories were classified as possessors of a scripture (ahl al-kitab) and granted protected (dhimmi) status. According to Bernard Lewis, one minority (the Jews) found their position "somewhat improved" from the rule of the Sassanids and Christian Byzantines.

However, according to Jebran Chamieh, the treatment of the non-Muslims by Caliph Umar (at least) was "harsh...In 635–636, he expelled the Christians of Najran from their region and the Jews of Khaybar from their city. The Jews went to Jericho in Jordan and the Christians to Syria and Iraq. No Jew or Christian remained in Hejaz. To Caliph Umar also are attributed the "Edicts" that discriminate against the "People of the Book"."

=== Conquered land ===
According to Islamic law, Muslim conquerors may do as they wish with the property of non-Muslims who did not surrender before being conquered, (enemy who surrendered under terms of a treaty were generally allowed to keep their land), and many Muslims called for Umar to distributed the land of the conquered as spoils among the Arabs (according to a work by Abdus Salam Nadvi based on Muslim literature).

Instead, Umar allowed the non-Muslims landowners to keep their land and set up a system of taxation of land. (Nadvi attributing this to Umar's benevolence, and non-Muslim scholar Laura Vaglieri to Umar's good sense – the conquering rank and file who the land might have been divided among being Bedouin, who knew herding and raiding but not the cultivation skills of peasantry.)

=== Districts or provinces ===
Under Abu Bakr, the empire was not clearly divided into provinces, though it had many administrative districts.

Under Umar the Empire was divided into a number of provinces which were as follows:

1. Arabia was divided into two provinces, Mecca and Medina;
2. Iraq was divided into two provinces, Basra and Kufa;
3. Jazira was divided into two provinces, the Tigris and the Euphrates;
4. Syria was a province;
5. Palestine was divided in two provinces: Ayla and Ramla;
6. Egypt was divided into two provinces: Upper Egypt and Lower Egypt;
7. Persia was divided into three provinces: Khorasan, Azerbaijan, and Fars.

In his testament Umar had instructed his successor, Uthman, not to make any change in the administrative setup for one year after his death, which Uthman honored; however, after the expiration of the moratorium, he made Egypt one province and created a new province comprising North Africa.

During Uthman's reign the caliphate was divided into 12 provinces. These were:

1. Medina;
2. Mecca;
3. Yemen;
4. Kufa;
5. Basra;
6. Jazira;
7. Fars;
8. Azerbaijan;
9. Khorasan;
10. Syria;
11. Egypt;
12. Maghreb.

The provinces were further divided into districts. Each of the 100 or more districts of the empire, along with the main cities, were administered by a governor (Wāli). Other officers at the provincial level were:

1. Katib, the Chief Secretary;
2. Katib-ud-Diwan, the Military Secretary;
3. Sahib-ul-Kharaj, the Revenue Collector;
4. Sahib-ul-Ahdath, the Police Chief;
5. Sahib-ul-Bait-ul-Mal, the Treasury Officer;
6. Qadi, the Chief Judge.

In some districts there were separate military officers, though the governor was in most cases the commander-in-chief of the army quartered in the province. The officers were appointed by the Caliph. Every appointment was made in writing. At the time of appointment, an instrument of instructions was issued to regulate the conduct of the governors. On assuming office, the Governor was required to assemble the people in the main mosque and read the instrument of instructions before them.

Umar's general instructions to his officers were:

Remember, I have not appointed you as commanders and tyrants over the people. I have sent you as leaders instead, so that the people may follow your example. Give the Muslims their rights and do not beat them lest they become abused. Do not praise them unduly, lest they fall into the error of conceit. Do not keep your doors shut in their faces, lest the more powerful of them eat up the weaker ones. And do not behave as if you were superior to them, for that is tyranny over them.

During the reign of Abu Bakr, the state was economically weak, while during Umar's reign because of an increase in revenues and other sources of income, the state was on its way to economic prosperity. Hence Umar felt it necessary to treat the officers strictly in order to prevent corruption. During his reign, at the time of appointment, every officer was required to swear an oath:

1. That he would not ride a Turkic horse (which was a symbol of pride);
2. That he would not wear fine clothes;
3. That he would not eat sifted flour;
4. That he would not keep a porter at his door;
5. That he would always keep his door open to the public.

Caliph Umar himself followed the above postulates strictly. During the reign of Uthman the state became more economically prosperous than ever before; the allowance of the citizens was increased by 25%, and the economic condition of the ordinary person was more stable, which led Caliph Uthman to revoke the second and third postulates of the oath.

At the time of an officer's appointment, a complete inventory of all his possessions was prepared and kept on record. If there was later an unusual increase in his possessions, he was immediately called to account, and the unlawful property confiscated by the State. The principal officers were required to come to Mecca on the occasion of the Hajj, during which people were free to present any complaint against them. In order to minimize the chances of corruption, Umar made it a point to pay high salaries to the staff. Provincial governors received as much as five to seven thousand dirhams annually besides their share of the spoils of war (if they were also the commander-in-chief of the army of their sector).

=== Judicial administration ===
The judicial administration, like the rest of the administrative structure of the Rashidun Caliphate, was set up by Umar, and it remained basically unchanged throughout the duration of the Caliphate. In order to provide adequate and speedy justice for the people, justice was administered according to the principles of Islam.

Accordingly, Qadis (judges) were appointed at all administrative levels. The Qadis were chosen for their integrity and learning in Islamic law. Wealthy men and men of high social status, compensated highly by the Caliphate, were appointed in order to make them resistant to bribery or undue influence based on social position. The Qadis also were not allowed to engage in trade. Judges were appointed in sufficient numbers to staff every district with at least one.

=== Accountability of rulers ===
Sunni Islamic lawyers have commented on when it is permissible to disobey, impeach or remove rulers in the Caliphate. This is usually when the rulers are not meeting public responsibilities obliged upon them under Islam.

Al-Mawardi said that if the rulers meet their Islamic responsibilities to the public, the people must obey their laws, but if they become either unjust or severely ineffective, then the Caliph or ruler must be impeached via the Majlis al-Shura. Al-Juwayni argued that Islam is the goal of the ummah, so any ruler that deviates from this goal must be impeached. Al-Ghazali believed that oppression by a caliph is enough for impeachment. Rather than just relying on impeachment, Ibn Hajar al-Asqalani obliged rebellion upon the people if the caliph began to act with no regard for Islamic law. Al-Asqalani said that to ignore such a situation is haram, and those who cannot revolt inside the caliphate should launch a struggle from outside. He used two ayahs from the Qur'an to justify this:

And they (the sinners on qiyama) will say, "Our Lord! We obeyed our leaders and our chiefs, and they misled us from the right path. Our Lord! Give them (the leaders) double the punishment you give us and curse them with a very great curse" ...^{[33:67–68]}

Islamic lawyers have commented that when the rulers refuse to step down via successful impeachment through the Majlis, becoming dictators through the support of a corrupt army, then the majority, upon agreement, has the option to launch a revolution against them. Many noted that this option is only exercised after factoring in the potential cost of life.

== Spoils ==
=== Impact on conquerors ===
The Arab conquests extended to Merv (in what is now Turkestan) by 652. The victorious armies returned to Medina with great treasure including gold and slaves. It was "as if the sky had opened with a flood of gold". Abu Hasan al-Mas'udi (d.957) also writes of the great mass of wealth acquired in a relatively short period of times. Taha Husayn writes:

We find that some Companions who served Islam so well that the Prophet promised them paradise were swayed by the prestige and great wealth they got. Their ambitions clashed; they quarreled and their suspicions of each other were extreme.

=== Distribution ===
==== Beginning of the allowance ====
After the Battle of the Yarmuk and Battle of al-Qadisiyyah the Muslims gained immense plunder, filling the coffers at Medina. The problem before Umar was what to do with this money. Someone suggested that the money should be kept in the treasury as a reserve for public expenditures. However, this view was not acceptable to the general body of Muslims. Accordingly, a consensus was reached to distribute whatever was received during a year to the citizens as "allowances" (aka pensions), the register of which was called the dīwān.

The next question was what system should be adopted for distribution. One suggestion was to distribute it equally on an ad hoc basis. Others objected that, as the spoils were considerable, the proposal would make the people very rich. It was therefore agreed that, instead of ad hoc division, the amount of the allowance to the stipend should be determined beforehand and this allowance should be paid regardless of the amount of the spoils.

Umar drew up lists of who had a right to booty from the conquests, ranking recipients according to how early they had converted to Islam and how close they were in bloodline to Muhammad. Blood relationship was organized by clan. Banu Hashim appeared as the first clan, then the clan of Abu Bakr, and then the clan of Umar. Umar accepted the first two placements but relegated his clan lower on the relationship scale.

The main provisions of the final scale of allowance approved by Umar were:

1. The widows of Muhammad received 12,000 dirhams each
2. Abbas ibn Abd al-Muttalib, the uncle of Muhammad, received an annual allowance of 7,000 dirhams
3. The grandsons of Muhammad, Hasan ibn Ali and Husayn ibn Ali received 5,000 dirhams each
4. Those who had become Muslims by the time of the Treaty of al-Hudaybiya got 4,000 dirhams each
5. The veterans of the Apostasy wars received 3,000 dirhams each

Under this scale, Umar's son Abd Allah ibn Umar received an allowance of 3,000 dirhams, while Usama ibn Zayd got 4,000. The ordinary Muslim citizens were given allowances of between 2,000 and 2,500. The regular annual allowance was given only to the urban population because they formed the backbone of the state's economic resources. The Bedouin living in the desert, cut off from the state's affairs and making no contributions to development, were nevertheless often given stipends. On assuming office, Uthman increased these stipends by 25%.

Examples of stipends for Muslims during Rashidun
Classes of Muslim beneficiaries	Dirhams per annum received
Participants of Battle of Badr	5,000
Muhajireen of Habsh and participants of Battle of Uhud	4,000
Muhajireen before Conquest of Mecca	3,000
Those who embraced Islam after the Conquest of Mecca	2,000
Participants of the Battles of Qadisiyyah and Yarmuk	2,000
Inhabitants of Yemen	4,000
Soldiers after the Battles of Qadisiyyah and Yarmuk	3,000
Without any distinction of status	2,000

== Economy ==
According to a work on early Islam by Abdus Salam Nadvi, among their other virtues, the Rashidun were known for their leniency in levying taxation.

=== Treasury and coinage ===
Bayt al-Mal (lit., the house of money), i.e. the treasury, or the state exchequer, was established by the first caliph Abu Bakr. His successor Umar built the building housing it.

Revenues for the Bayt came from taxes on lands left in the hands of their owners, rents from confiscated lands, and to a lesser extent the zakat tithe paid by Muslims, one fifth of the military spoils, and tribute and personal taxes paid by the conquered.

A "major portion" of the funds collected for the Bayt al-Mal (at least under caliph Umar) went to stipends or allowances that Muslims gave themselves as conquerors of the land.

After consulting the companions, Umar decided to establish the central treasury at Medina. Abdullah bin Arqam was appointed as the Treasury Officer. He was assisted by Abd al-Rahman ibn Awf and Muiqib. A separate Accounts Department was also set up to maintain spending records.

Later treasuries were set up in the provinces. After meeting the local expenditure, the provincial treasuries were required to remit the surplus revenue to the central treasury at Medina. According to Al-Ya'qubi, the salaries and stipends charged to the central treasury amounted to over 30 million dirhams. A separate building was constructed for the royal treasury, the Bayt al-Mal which in large cities, was protected by as many as 400 guards. Most historical accounts state that among the Rashidun caliphs, Uthman was the first to strike coins; however, some accounts state that Umar was the first to do so.

Social welfare and pensions were introduced in early Islamic law as forms of zakāt (charity), one of the Five Pillars of Islam, since the time of Umar. The taxes (including zakāt and jizya) collected in the treasury of an Islamic government were used to provide income for the needy, including the poor, elderly, orphans, widows, and the disabled. According to the Islamic jurist Al-Ghazali (Algazel, 1058–1111), the government was also expected to stockpile food supplies in every region in case a disaster or famine occurred. Many Muslim thus argue the Rashidun caliphate was thus one of the earliest welfare states.

Rashidun coinage

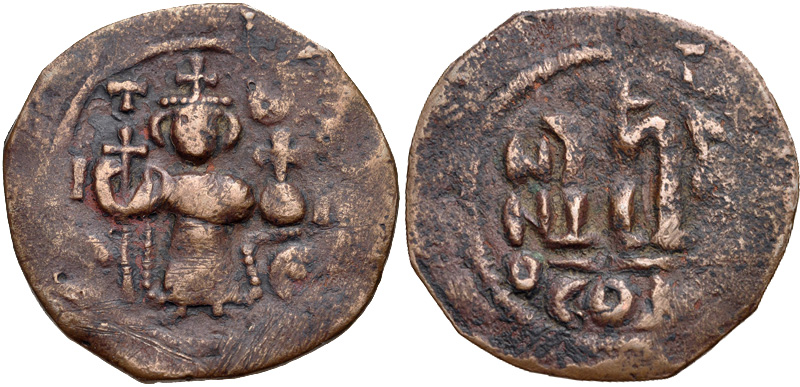
Coin in use during the Rashidun Caliphate (661–750 CE). Pseudo-Byzantine type with depictions of the Byzantine Emperor Constans II holding the cross-tipped staff and globus cruciger.

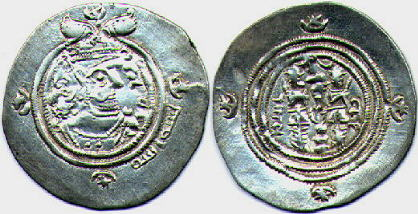
The Rashidun caliphs used the Sassanids symbols (Star and crescent, fire temple, the picture of the last emperor Khosrau II) by adding the phrase bismillah on their coins, instead of designing a new one.

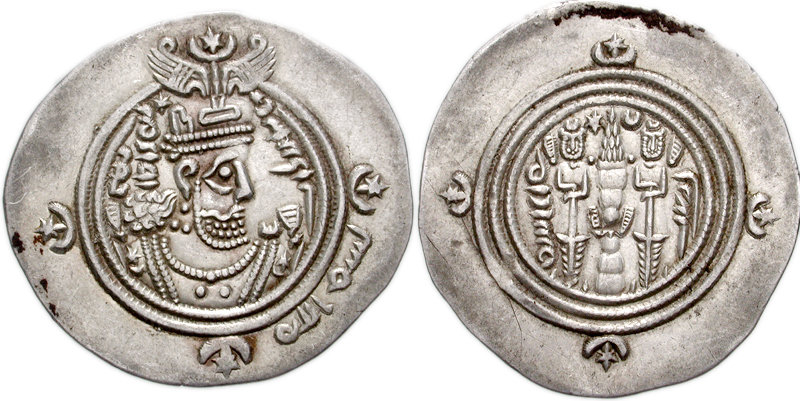
Coin of the Rashidun Caliphate. Imitation of Sasanid Empire ruler Khosrau II type. BYS (Bishapur) mint. Dated YE 25 = AH 36 (AD 656). Sasanian style bust imitating Khosrau II right; bismillah in margin/ Fire altar with ribbons and attendants; star and crescent flanking flames; date to left, mint name to right.

=== Taxation ===
A "regular system of revenue" for Iraq was set up during Umar's caliphate. According to Abdus Salam Nadvi, Umar chose to set up a system of taxation of the current (non-Muslim) owners of land of the conquered people instead of distributing the land as spoils among the conquering Arabs.

Among other benevolences reported in Muslim literature, the Rashidun were said to be lenient in their tax collection. He appointed capable companions of Muhammad to organize an assessment of arable/taxable land, confiscating land only from pagan temples, "absconders and the rebellious" and some others, while setting taxes according to the value of crops raised from the land, giving the taxpayer the choice of several tax collectors to pay their taxes to. In doing all this he sought advice from "venerable persons" for improvement of his work, including non-Muslim dhimmi subjects. Outside of Iraq, he forbade extra confiscation of crops above the rate of tribute taxation and forbade Muslims (who received stipends) from taking possession of the conquered people's land, threatening or punishing those who did. He also confiscated land from those who did not cultivate it.

Caliph Ali reportedly advised a newly appointed tax collector:

"Do not beat with while receiving revenue from any person. Do not take their livelihood, summer and winter garments and beasts of burden. Neither cause anyone stand".

The economic resources of the state were:

1. Zakāt
2. Ushr
3. Jizya
4. Fay
5. Khums
6. Kharaj

==== Zakat ====
Zakāt taxes were levied on Muslims to be given to the poor (usually amounting to 2.5% of dormant wealth over a certain amount). The Rashidun caliphs reportedly complied with the practice of Muhammad of not taking the best goods of the taxpayers for Zakat.

==== Ushr ====
Ushr was a tax on levied Muslim non-Muslim merchants and artisans. It was also applied on Muslim cultivators. It was a reciprocal 10% levy on agricultural land as well as on imported merchandise that taxed the Muslims on their products. Umar was the first Muslim ruler to levy ushr. Umar issued instructions that ushr should be levied in such a way so as to avoid hardship, so as not to affect trade within the Caliphate. The tax was levied only on merchandise meant for sale; goods imported for consumption or personal use but not for sale were not taxed. Merchandise valued at 200 dirhams or less was not taxed. Imports by citizens for trade purposes were subject to the customs duty or import tax at lower rates. In the case of agricultural produce, ushr is paid by harvest and not annually, at a rate of 5% or 10% depending on the means of irrigation by which the crop is produced.

==== Jizya ====
Jizya was a per capita tax imposed on able bodied (disabled persons were exempt) non-Muslim men (known as dhimmis). Nadvi states that collectors were forbidden from abusing the dhimmis while collecting the jizya.

==== Fay ====
Fay was the income from state land, whether an agricultural land, or a meadow, or land with any natural mineral reserves.

==== Khums ====
Ghanimah or Khums represented war spoils, four-fifths of which was distributed among the soldiers in service, while one-fifth was allotted to the state.

==== Kharaj ====
Kharaj was a tax levied on the agricultural lands of both Muslims and non-Muslims. Initially, after the first Muslim conquests in the 7th century, kharaj usually denoted a lump-sum duty levied upon the conquered provinces and collected by the officials of the former Byzantine and Sasanian empires. The taxation rate varied according to the conditions of the farmer and their harvest, if a farmer encountered irrigation constraints or inclement weather that impacted the harvest, the rate of taxation would be reduced. Muslim landowners also paid ushr, which is a religious tithe.

== Public works ==
Upon conquest, in almost all cases, the caliphs were burdened with the maintenance and construction of roads and bridges in return for the conquered nation's political loyalty.

Civil welfare in Islam started in the form of the construction and purchase of wells. During the caliphate, the Muslims repaired many of the aging wells in the lands they conquered.

In addition to wells, the Muslims built many tanks and canals. Many canals were purchased and new ones constructed. While some canals were excluded for the use of monks (such as a spring purchased by Talha ibn Ubayd Allah) and the needy, most canals were open to general public use. Some canals were constructed between settlements, such as the Saad canal that provided water to Anbar, and the Abi Musa Canal to provide water to Basra.

During a famine, Umar ibn al-Khattab ordered the construction of a canal in Egypt connecting the river Nile to the Red Sea. The purpose of the canal was to facilitate the transport of grain from Egypt to Arabia through a sea-route, hitherto transported only by land. The canal was constructed within a year by Amr ibn al-As, and Abdus Salam Nadvi writes that "Arabia was rid of famine for all the times to come."

After four floods hit Mecca in the years after Muhammad's death, Umar ordered the construction of two dams to protect the Kaaba. He also constructed a dam near Medina to protect its fountains from flooding.

=== Settlements ===
The area of Basra was very sparsely populated when it was conquered by the Muslims. During the reign of Umar, the Muslim army found it a suitable place to construct a base. The area was later settled and a mosque was erected.

Upon the conquest of Midian, it was settled by Muslims. However, the environment was soon considered harsh, and Umar ordered the resettlement of the 40,000 settlers to Kufa. The new buildings were constructed from mud bricks instead of reeds, a material that was popular in the region but caught fire easily.

During the conquest of Egypt, the area of Fustat was used by the Muslim army as a base. Upon the conquest of Alexandria in 641, the Muslims returned and settled in the same area. Initially the land was primarily used for pasture, but later buildings were constructed.

Other already populated areas were greatly expanded. At Mosul, Arfajah al-Bariqi at the command of Umar, constructed a fort, a few churches, a mosque and a locality for the Jewish population.

== Significance and legacy ==
=== Notable features ===
- All four Rashidun caliphs were connected to Muhammad through marriage and were early converts to Islam, and so were thought to be "a continuation of the prophetic period with all its virtues and sanctity"; the daughters of Abu Bakr and Umar, Aisha and Hafsa respectively, were married to Muhammad, and two of Muhammad's daughters Ruqayyah and Umm Kulthum were married to Uthman, while another daughter of Muhammad, Fatimah, was married to Ali, who was also Muhammad's cousin and raised in his household.
- They were among Muhammad's closest companions by association and support, often praised by him, and were delegated roles of leadership within the nascent Muslim community.

=== According to different schools ===
==== Sunni ====
Among the notable features of the Rashidun caliphs were that:

- Their succession was not hereditary, something that would become the custom after them, beginning with the subsequent Umayyad Caliphate and continued by the later Abbasid Caliphate. Council decision-making determined the choice of successor originally. They were chosen according to the will of senior leaders in the Muslim community, rather than inheriting the title through familial relation to their predecessors like most later caliphs;
- They were among the ten Muslims promised paradise according to several hadiths in Sunni Islam.

The term Rashidun, or "Rightly Guided", is derived from a famous Sunni hadith where Muhammad foretold that the caliphate of prophecy after him would last for 30 years (the length of the Rashidun Caliphate) and would then be followed by kingship (the subsequent Umayyad Caliphate and later Abbasid Caliphate being hereditary monarchies). (Note: There are a number of hadith about the caliphate lasting for 30 years followed by monarchy.: According to Abu Dawud "The Caliphate of Prophecy will last thirty years; then Allah will give the Kingdom of His Kingdom to anyone He wills. Sa'id told that Safinah said to him: Calculate Abu Bakr's caliphate as two years, Umar's as ten, Uthman's as twelve and Ali so and so. Sa'id said: I said to Safinah: They conceive that Ali was not a caliph. He replied: The buttocks of Marwan told a lie".; According to Abu Dawud "The caliphate of Prophecy will last thirty years; then Allah will give the Kingdom to whom he wishes; or his kingdom to whom he wishes".; According to al-Tirmidhi "The Messenger of Allah (s.a.w) said: "Al-Khilafah will be in my Ummah for thirty years, then there will be monarchy after that". Then Safinah said to me: "Count the Khilafah of Abu Bakr", then he said: "Count the Khilafah of Umar and the Khilafah of Uthman". Then he said to me: "Count the Khilafah of Ali".' He said: "So we found that they add up to thirty years".)

The Rightly Guided Caliphate is also featured in other hadiths about the end-times in Sunan Abu Dawood and Musnad Ahmad ibn Hanbal, where it is foretold they will be restored once again by God in the time before Judgement Day. The first four caliphs are particularly significant to modern intra-Islamic debates: for Sunni Muslims, they are models of righteous rule; for Shia Muslims (at least Twelver Shia), the first three of the four were usurpers. Accepted traditions of both Sunni and Shia Muslims detail disagreements and tensions between the four rightly guided caliphs.

In Sunni Islam, the application of the label "rightly-guided" to the first caliphs signifies their status as models whose actions and opinions (Arabic: sunna) should be followed and emulated from a religious point of view. In this sense, they are both rightly-guided and rightly-guiding: the religious narratives about their lives serve as a guide to right belief. For example, Sunni historian Salam Nadvi emphasizes that as companions of Muhammad, the Rashidun were "deserving for Divine caliphate" because of their "beliefs and good deeds", their "moral characteristics", adherence to "the true path", their forbidding others from doing evil deeds, reluctance to be rulers, humility about their abilities ("O people! I do not wish to be a Caliph. If you expect following the Sunnah, I shall not be able to do so do not follow me"), disinterest in comfort and pleasure (sleeping on pebble covered ground).

Sunni Muslims have long viewed the Rashidun as having an exemplary system of governance based upon Islamic righteousness and merit, which many seek to emulate. The Sunnis have also equated this system with the worldly success that was promised by Allah, in the Quran and hadith, to those Muslims who pursued their god's pleasure; this has further added to the appeal to emulate the perceived success of the Rashidun era.

In the modern Sunni Salafi movement, some have asserted that only was "perfect justice and fairness fully realized" under the Rashidun, and that Muslims should not only "strive to replicate" its religious practices, but that Muslims should also strive to follow (what they believe to be) everyday practices of the Rashidun, such as miswak teeth cleaning, not wearing neckties, not applauding speakers, etc. (Note: Khaled Abou El Fadl, described this as part of the belief set of "puritan" Salafis, with whom he disagreed.) (Note: According to International Crisis Group, "The Salafiyya accordingly invoked the founding fathers of Islam, the so-called "venerable ancestors" (al-Salaf al-Salih, whence the movement's name), notably the Prophet Mohammed and the first four "rightly-guided" Caliphs—al-Rashidun—of the original Muslim community in seventh century Arabia in order to identify the fundamental principles of Islam in their original pristine purity."; According to Ahmad S. Moussalli, "Qutb acknowledges, for instance, the legitimacy of the first four caliphs in Islam because they were chosen by the people, but denies the Umayyids any legitimacy because they changed this rule and force themselves on the community.") Islamic fundamentalists see the Rashidun caliphs as not only a model to be followed but succeeding dynasties such as the Umayyads and Abbasids as "religious deviants".

At the same time, it has been noted that the domination of Arabs over non-Arabs on an ethnic basis during Umar's reign and the widespread nepotism of Uthman's caliphate are in essential conflict with the call of Islam.

==== Twelver Shia ====
The (Twelver) Shia view is that, similar to the past prophets in the Quran, the succession to Muhammad was settled by divine appointment (not consensus), and chosen from Muhammad's family. Specifically, the successor was Muhammad's cousin and son-in-law, Ali ibn Abi Talib, who Muhammad announced as his rightful successor (according to Shia doctrine) shortly before his death at the event of Ghadir Khumm and on other occasions, e.g., at the event of Dhul Asheera. In the Shia view, while direct revelation ended with Muhammad's death, Ali remained the righteous guide or Imam towards God, similar to the successors of the past prophets in the Quran. After Muhammad's death, Ali inherited Muhammad's divine knowledge and his authority to correctly interpret the Quran, especially its allegorical and metaphorical verses (mutashabihat).

In the Shia view, since the time of the first prophet, Adam, the earth has never remained without an Imam, in the form of prophets and their divinely-appointed successors. Likewise, Imamate was passed on from Ali to the next Imam, Hasan, by divinely-inspired designation (nass). After Hasan's death, Husayn and nine of his descendants are the Shia Imams, the last of whom, Muhammad al-Mahdi went into occultation in 260 AH, due to the hostility of his enemies and the dangers to his life. His advent is awaited by the Shia, who believe him to be the Mahdi. In his absence, the vacuum in the Shia leadership is partly filled by marjaiyya and, more recently, by wilayat al-faqqih, i.e., guardianship of the Islamic jurist.

==== Views of other Shia ====
While the Ismaili Shi'ites accept a closely-related understanding of Imamate as the Twelver Shia, the Ismailis under the leadership of the Aga Khans do recognize the caliphates of the first three caliphs before Ali ibn Abi Talib while distinguishing Imamate as a separate office apart from the Caliphate:

In the present Imamat the final reconciliation between the Shia and Sunni doctrines has been publicly proclaimed by myself on exactly the same lines as Hazrat Ali did at the death of the Prophet and during the first thirty years after that. The political and worldly Khalifat was accepted by Hazrat Ali in favour of the three first Khalifs voluntarily and with goodwill for the protection of the interests of the Muslims throughout the world. We Ismailis now in the same spirit accept the Khalifat of the first Khalifs and such other Khalifs as during the last thirteen centuries helped the cause of Islam, politically, socially and from a worldly point of view. On the other hand, the Spiritual Imamat remained with Hazrat Ali and remains with his direct descendants always alive till the day of Judgement.

— Aga Khan III, Selected Speeches and Writings of Sir Sultan Muhammad Shah, p. 1417

The Nizari Ismailis on the other hand, have come to accept the caliphates of Abu Bakr, Umar, and Uthman in the modern times under the leadership and teachings of the Aga Khans, even though polemics against those early caliphs were prevalent during the Fatimid period. For instance, the Fatimid Imam-Caliph Al-Hakim bi Amr Allah ordered the public cursing of the first three caliphs in the year 1005 in Cairo.

The Zaydi Shia Muslims also believe the first three caliphs to be legitimate leaders in addition to Ali.

==== Kharijites ====
The Kharijites recognize only the first six years of Uthman's caliphate as being legitimate, and only the caliphate of Ali before the arbitration that followed the Battle of Siffin.

== See also ==
- Caliphate of Abu Bakr
- The Four Companions
- Islamic Golden Age
- Early islamic conquest
- Talut
- The ten to whom Paradise was promised
- Timeline of Medina

== Sources ==
- Abbas, H. (2021). The Prophet's Heir – The Life of Ali ibn Abi Talib. Yale University Press. ISBN 978-0-300-25205-7.
- Abun-Nasr, Jamil M. (1987). A History of the Maghrib in the Islamic Period. Cambridge, New York, Melbourne: Cambridge University Press. ISBN 0-521-33767-4.
- Album, Stephen; Bates, Michael L.; Floor, Willem (30 December 2012) [15 December 1992]. "COINS AND COINAGE". Encyclopædia Iranica. Vol. VI/1. New York: Columbia University. pp. 14–41. doi:10.1163/2330-4804_EIRO_COM_7783. "As the Arabs of the Ḥejāz had used the drahms of the Sasanian emperors [...] it was natural for them to leave many of the Sasanian mints in operation, striking coins like those of the emperors in every detail except for the addition of brief Arabic inscriptions like besmellāh in the margins."
- as-Suyuti, Jalal ad-Din (1995). "Umar ibn al-Khattab". The History of the Khalifahs who took the right way (a translation of the chapters on al-Khulafa' ar-Rashidun from Tarikh al-Khulafa' of Jalal ad-Din as-Suyuti) (PDF). Translated by Abdassamad Clarke (3rd ed.). London: Ta-Ha Publishers Ltd. pp. 127–131.
- Bosworth, C. Edmund (July 1996). "Arab Attacks on Rhodes in the Pre-Ottoman Period". Journal of the Royal Asiatic Society. 6 (2): 157–164. doi:10.1017/S1356186300007161. JSTOR 25183178. S2CID 163550092.
- Bosworth, C.E. (2004). "al-K̲h̲ulafāʾ al-Rās̲h̲idūn". In Bearman, P. J.; Bianquis, Th.; Bosworth, C. E.; van Donzel, E. & Heinrichs, W. P. (eds.). The Encyclopaedia of Islam, Second Edition. Volume XII: Supplement. Leiden: E. J. Brill. pp. 528–529. ISBN 978-90-04-13974-9.
- Chamieh, Jebran (1977). Traditionalists, Militants and Liberal in Present Islam. Research and Publishing House.
- Donner, Fred McGraw (1998). Narratives of Islamic Origins: The Beginnings of Islamic Historical Writing. Darwin Press. ISBN 0878501274.
- Donner, Fred M. (2010). Muhammad and the Believers, at the Origins of Islam. Cambridge: Harvard University Press. ISBN 9780674050976.
- Fitzpatrick, Coeli; Walker, Adam Hani (25 April 2014). Muhammad in History, Thought, and Culture - An Encyclopedia of the Prophet of God [2 volumes]. ABC-Clio. ISBN 978-1-61069-178-9.
- Frastuti, Melia (2020). "Reformasi Sistem Administrasi Pemerintahan, Penakhlukkan di Darat Dan Dilautan Pada Era Bani Umayyah". Jurnal Kajian Ekonomi Hukum Syariah (in Malay). 6 (2): 119–127. doi:10.37567/shar-e.v6i2.227. S2CID 234578454.
- Hazleton, Lesley (2013). The First Muslim - the Story of Muhammad. Atlantic Books. ISBN 9781782392316.
- Hinds, Martin (October 1972). "The Murder of the Caliph Uthman". International Journal of Middle East Studies. 13 (4): 450–469. doi:10.1017/S0020743800025216. JSTOR 162492. S2CID 159763369.
- Howard-Johnston, James (2006). East Rome, Sasanian Persia and the End of Antiquity. Ashgate Publishing. ISBN 0-86078-992-6.
- Hoyland, Robert G. (2014). In God's Path: The Arab Conquests and the Creation of an Islamic Empire. Oxford University Press. ISBN 978-0-19-991636-8.
- Hoyland, Robert G. (2015). In God's Path: The Arab Conquests and the Creation of an Islamic Empire. Oxford University Press.
- Ibn al-Adawi, Abu Abd Allah Mustafa, ed. (2008). al-Ṣawāʿiq al-Muḥriqa fī al-Radd ʿalā Ahl al-Bidʿ wa-l-Zandaqa, taʾlīf Shihāb al-Dīn Aḥmad ibn Ḥajar al-Makkī al-Haytamī. Cairo: Maktabat Fayyāḍ.
- Jafri, S. H. M. (1979). Origins and Early Development of Shia Islam. London: Longman.
- Lapidus, Ira M. (2014). A History of Islamic Societies. Cambridge University Press. ISBN 978-0-521-51430-9.
- Lewis, Bernard (1995). The Middle East: A Brief History of the Last 2000 Years. New York: Touchstone.
- Madelung, Wilferd (1997). The Succession to Muhammad – A Study of the Early Caliphate. Cambridge: Cambridge University Press. ISBN 0521646960.
- McHugo, John (2017). A Concise History of Sunnis & Shi'is. Georgetown University Press. ISBN 978-1-62-616587-8.
- Melchert, Christopher (2020). "The Rightly Guided Caliphs - The Range of Views Preserved in Ḥadīth". In al-Sarhan, Saud (ed.). Political Quietism in Islam: Sunni and Shi'i Practice and Thought. London and New York: I.B. Tauris. pp. 63–79. ISBN 978-1-83860-765-4.
- Mikaberidze, Alexander (2011). Conflict and Conquest in the Islamic World – A Historical Encyclopedia, Volume 1. ABC-Clio. ISBN 9781598843361.
- Momen, Moojan (1985). Introduction to Shi'i Islam. Yale University Press. ISBN 9780853982005.
- Nadvi, Abdus Salam (2000). The ways of the Sahabah. Translated by Muhammad Yunus Qureshi. Karachi: Darul Ishaat.
- Netton, Ian Richard (19 December 2013). Encyclopaedia of Islam. Routledge. ISBN 9781135179601. Archived from the original on 15 August 2023.
- Nicolle, David (2009). The Great Islamic Conquests AD 632–750. Osprey Publishing. ISBN 978-1-84603-273-8.
- Nigosian, Solomon Alexander (2004). Islam: Its History, Teaching, and Practices. Indiana University Press. ISBN 0-253-21627-3.
- Pellat, Charles (2011). "Abū Loʾloʾa". In Yarshater, Ehsan (ed.). Encyclopaedia Iranica.
- al-Sallabi, Ali M. (2014). Khattab, Huda (ed.). Al-Hasan Ibn Ali: His Life and Times. Translated by Khattab, Nasiruddin (English 1 ed.). Riyadh: International Islamic Publishing House. ISBN 9786035012133.
- Shah-Kazemi, Reza (2006a). "Ali ibn Abi Talib". In Meri, Josef W. (ed.). Medieval Islamic civilization: An encyclopedia. Routledge. p. 36. ISBN 9780415966900.
- Sowerwine, James E. (2010). Caliph and Caliphate. Oxford Bibliographies Online Research Guide Oxford University Press. ISBN 9780199806003.
- Rane, Halim (2010). Islam and Contemporary Civilisation. Academic Monographs. ISBN 9780522857283.
- Toral-Niehoff, Isabel (2021). "Talking about Arab Origins: The Transmission of the ayyām al-ʿarab in Kūfa, Baṣra and Baghdād" (PDF). In Scheiner, J.; Janos, D. (eds.). The Place to Go Contexts of Learning in Baghdād, 750-1000 C.E. Darwin Press. pp. 43–69.
- Treadgold, Warren (1988). The Byzantine Revival, 780–842. Stanford, California: Stanford University Press. p. 268. ISBN 978-0-8047-1462-4.
- al-Turki, Abd Allah, ed. (1998). al-Bidāya wa-l-Nihāya, li-l-ḥāfiẓ ʿImād al-Dīn Abī al-Fidāʾ Ismāʿīl ibn ʿUmar ibn Kathīr al-Qurashī al-Dimashqī (in Arabic). Vol. 11. Dār Hajar.
- Vasiliev, Alexander A. (1935). Byzance et les Arabes, Tome I: La dynastie d'Amorium (820–867). Corpus Bruxellense Historiae Byzantinae (in French). Vol. 1. French ed.: Henri Grégoire, Marius Canard. Brussels: Éditions de l'Institut de philologie et d'histoire orientales. p. 90.
- Vaglieri, Laura Veccia (1970). "The Patriarchal and Umayyad caliphates". In Holt, P. M.; Lambton, Ann K. S.; Lewis, Bernard (eds.). The Cambridge History of Islam, Volume 1A: The Central Islamic Lands from Pre-Islamic Times to the First World War. Cambridge University Press. pp. 57–103. doi:10.1017/CHOL9780521219464.005. ISBN 9780521219464.
- Hinds, Martin (1996). Studies in Early Islamic History. Darwin Press. ISBN 978-0-87850-109-0.
- Hathaway, Jane (2003). A Tale of Two Factions: Myth, Memory, and Identity in Ottoman Egypt and Yemen. Albany, New York: State University of New York Press. ISBN 978-0-7914-5883-9.
- Nicolle, David (1993). Armies of the Muslim Conquest. Osprey Publishing. ISBN 978-1-85532-279-0.
- Lohlker, Rüdiger (2013). Jihadism: Online Discourses and Representations. Studying Jihadism. Vol. 2. V&R unipress GmbH. ISBN 978-3-8471-0068-3.
- Lassner, Jacob (1986). Islamic Revolution and Historical Memory: An Inquiry into the Art of ʻAbbāsid Apologetics. American University of Beirut. ISBN 978-3-8471-0068-3.
- Thomas, D. (2008). "Nahj al-balagha". In Netton, I.R. (ed.). Encyclopedia of Islamic Civilisation and Religion. Routledge. pp. 477–478. ISBN 978-0-7007-1588-6.
