= Layla bint al-Minhal =

Arab noblewoman in the early Islamic period

- ليلى بنت المنهال
- Born: Arabia
- Died: 630s/640s
- Other names: Laila, Umm Tamim
- Spouse(s): Malik ibn Nuwayra; Khalid Ibn Walid
- Parent: Al-Minhal

Layla bint al-Minhal (Arabic: ليلى بنت المنهال, romanized: Laylā bint al-Minhāl) was an Arab woman during the spread of Islam. She was a contemporary of the Islamic prophet Muhammad, and the wife of Malik ibn Nuwayra. After Malik was executed by prominent commander Khalid ibn al-Walid during the Ridda Wars, she married Khalid.

== Marriage ==
According to Ibn Hajar's account, Layla is described as very beautiful. It is said that during the execution of Malik ibn Nuwayra, Khalid ibn al-Walid saw her, prompting Malik to say to her, “You have killed me,” implying that she would be the cause of his death. However, modern scholar Taha Karaan considers this narration unreliable, as Ibn Hajar sourced it from Thabit ibn Qasim, an obscure figure absent from all major biographical works, including those of al-Bukhari, Ibn Abi Hatim, Ibn Hibban, al-Khatib al-Baghdadi, and al-Dhahabi.

In contrast, Ibn Khallikan’s narration provides more context, stating that Khalid executed Malik for withholding zakat and repeatedly referring to Muhammad as “your companion.” In his final words, Malik blamed Layla, to which Khalid replied that it was Allah who caused his death for renouncing Islam.

After Malik's execution, Khalid married Layla. Ibn Kathir states that Khalid observed praiseworthy traits in her and married her once she became lawful for him. Al-Tabari mentions that Khalid waited for her 'iddah (waiting period) to end before marrying her, while Ibn al-Athir confirms the marriage without stating that Khalid consummated it on the same night. Ibn Khallikan records two versions: one claiming that Khalid acquired her as part of the war booty and then married her, and another stating that she completed her 'iddah before accepting his proposal.

== Bibliography ==
- Al-Asqalani, Khalid (2020). Rather Misguided - A Response to Tijani Samawi's Then I was Guided. Amazon Digital Services LLC - Kdp. ISBN 979-8-679-02624-7.
