= Malik ibn Nuwayra =

Chief of the Banu Yarbu

- مالك بن نويرة
- Born: Arabia
- Died: 632 CE (10/11 AH)
- Spouse: Layla bint al-Minhal
- Relatives: Banu Yarbu
- Family: Mutammim ibn Nuwayra (brother)

Malik ibn Nuwayra (Arabic: مالك بن نويرة: died 632), was the chief of the Banu Yarbu, a clan of the Banu Hanzala, which was a large section of the powerful tribe of Bani Tamim.

Malik was appointed by Prophet Muhammad to collect zakah for the Banu Yarbu, but after the Prophet's death, he reportedly refused to send it to Medina. Abu Bakr sent an army and Khalid ibn al-Walid executed Malik, with historical sources attributing it to alleged apostasy.

== Death ==
Malik was reportedly appointed by Prophet Muhammad as the collector of the zakah ('alms tax') for his clan. After Prophet's death, he is said to have withheld zakah, prompting Abu Bakr to order his execution through Khalid ibn al-Walid. In 632, Khalid’s forces encountered Malik and his men, who affirmed their faith and offered no resistance. Despite objections from an Ansarite companion, Khalid reportedly ordered their execution and later married Malik’s widow, Layla bint al-Minhal. Umar is said to have urged Khalid’s removal from command, but Abu Bakr reportedly declined, stating, “I will not sheathe a sword which God has drawn for His service.”

Historians suggest Malik was executed for apostasy, citing his alleged support for Sajah, a self-proclaimed prophetess, his refusal to recognize Muhammad as a prophet, or his denial of zakah obligations. According to 8th-century historian Sayf ibn Umar, Malik allied with Sajah, his kinswoman, but abandoned her after her defeat by Banu Tamim clans and returned to al-Butah, where he faced Muslim forces. Sayf and other early historians, such as al-Tabari, noted that Malik called Muhammad "your companion" (Note: A phrase commonly used by polytheists, suggesting that Malik did not acknowledge Muhammad as a prophet.) and rejected zakah. However, Wilferd Madelung disputes this, arguing that if Malik had renounced Islam, Umar and others would not have opposed his execution. Ali al-Sallabi emphasizes Malik’s refusal to pay zakah as the primary issue, citing early sources like Ibn Sallam al-Jumahi and al-Nawawi, who state that some apostates, continued to perform prayer but rejected zakah, thereby denying a core pillar of Islam. Ibn Hajar cites a narration (Note: Mutammim ibn Nuwayrah said, “O Amīr al-Mu’minīn (Umar)! Indeed your brother died as a believer while my brother died as an apostate.”) in which Malik’s brother admitted his apostasy, which he presents as evidence for why Umar, during his caliphate, took no action against Khalid regarding the incident. Ibn Taymiyyah defends Khalid, arguing that his decision was a valid ijtihad and that the case remains uncertain; he adds that criticizing Khalid would involve speculation, which is prohibited in Islamic law.

Due to conflicting early sources, the exact circumstances of Malik’s death remain unclear. Ella Landau-Tasseron notes that "the truth behind Malik's career and death is likely to remain obscured by a multitude of conflicting reports." Al-Dhahabi emphasizes the prior piety of those involved and cautioned against both excessive praise and unjust blame. W. Montgomery Watt adds that the sources on Banu Tamim during the Ridda Wars are unclear, partly due to "the enemies of Khālid b. al-Walīd have twisted the stories to blacken him".

== Bibliography ==
- Al-Sallabi, Ali Mohammad (2007). The Biography of Abu Bakr as-Siddeeq. Darussalam Publishers & Distributors. ISBN 978-9-960-98491-9.
- Crone, P. (1978). "Khālid b. al-Walīd". In van Donzel, E.; Lewis, B.; Pellat, Ch. & Bosworth, C. E. (eds.). The Encyclopaedia of Islam, Second Edition. Volume IV: Iran–Kha. Leiden: E. J. Brill. pp. 928–929. ISBN 978-90-04-05745-6. OCLC 758278456.
- Glubb, Sir John Bagot (1963). The Great Arab Conquests. University of Minnesota: Hodder and Stoughton.
- Landau-Tasseron, Ella (1991). "Mālik b. Nuwayra". In Bosworth, C. E.; van Donzel, E. & Pellat, Ch. (eds.). The Encyclopaedia of Islam, Second Edition. Volume VI: Mahk–Mid. Leiden: E. J. Brill. pp. 267–269. ISBN 978-90-04-08112-3.
