= List of battles involving the Rashidun Caliphate =

Expansion of the Rashidun Caliphate under different caliphs (632–661)

This is the list of battles involving the Rashidun Caliphate ranked chronologically from 632, with the first caliph Abu Bakr As-Siddiq, to the last caliph in 661, Ali ibn Abi Talib.

Here is a legend to facilitate the reading of the outcomes of the battles below:

Victory
Defeat
Another result*

*e.g. result unknown or indecisive/inconclusive, result of internal conflict inside the Rashidun Caliphate, status quo ante bellum, or a treaty or peace without a clear result.

== Abu Bakr As-Siddiq (632–634) ==
Battle	Date		Opponents	Result	Sources
Battle	Start	End	Opponents	Result	Sources
Wars of Apostasy
Battle of Zhu Qissa	July 25, 632	July 30, 632	Rebel apostates	Victory	^{,}^{,}
Battle of Abraq	Mid-August 632		Rebel apostates	Victory	^{,}
Battle of Buzakha	September 632		Rebel apostates	Victory	^{,}^{,}
Battle of Zafar	October 632		Rebel apostates	Victory	^{,}^{,}
Battle of Ghamra	632		Rebel apostates	Victory	^{,}^{,}
Battle of Daumat-ul-Jandal	June 14, 633	September 10, 633	Rebel apostates	Victory	^{,}^{,}
Battle of Dibba	November 633		Rebel apostates	Victory	^{,}^{,}
Battle of Al-Yamama	633		Rebel apostates	Victory	^{,}^{,}
Battle of Nujair	633		Rebel apostates	Victory	^{,}^{,}
Battle of Naqra	632	633	Rebel apostates	Victory	^{,}^{,}
Muslim conquest of Persia
Battle of the Chains / Kazima	April 633		Sassanian Empire; Arab Christians	Victory	^{,}^{,}
Battle of the River	April 633		Sassanian Empire; Arab Christians	Victory	^{,}^{,}
Battle of Walaja	May 633		Sassanian Empire; Arab Christians	Victory	^{,}^{,}
Battle of Husayd	633		Sassanian Empire; Arab Christians	Victory	^{,}^{,}
Battle of Ullais	May 633		Sassanian Empire; Arab Christians	Victory	^{,}^{,}
Siege of Al-Hira	May 633		Sassanian Empire; Arab Christians	Victory	^{,}^{,}
Siege of al-Anbar	July 633		Sassanian Empire; Arab Christians	Victory	^{,}^{,}
Battle of Ayn al-Tamr	July 633		Sassanian Empire; Arab Christians	Victory	^{,}^{,}
Battle of Muzayyah	November 633		Sassanian Empire; Arab Christians	Victory	^{,}^{,}
Battle of Muzieh	November 633		Sassanian Empire; Arab Christians	Victory	^{,}^{,}
Battle of Sanni	November 633		Sassanian Empire; Arab Christians	Victory	^{,}^{,}
Battle of Zumail	November 633		Sassanian Empire; Arab Christians	Victory	^{,}^{,}
Battle of Firaz	December 633		Sassanian Empire; Byzantine Empire; Arab Christians	Victory	^{,}^{,}
1st Battle of Babylon	June 634	July 634	Sassanian Empire	Victory	^{,}^{,}
Byzantine–Arab Wars
Expedition of Usama bin Zayd	June 632		Byzantine Empire; Ghassanid Kingdom	Victory	^{,}^{,}
Expedition of Khalid ibn Sa'id	July 632 - early 634		Byzantine Empire; Arab Christians	Defeat	^{,}^{,}
Battle of Dathin	February 4, 634		Byzantine Empire	Victory	^{,}^{,}
Battle of Marj Rahit	April 24, 634		Ghassanid Kingdom; Byzantine Empire	Victory	^{,}^{,}
Battle of al-Qaryatayn	June 634		Ghassanid Kingdom	Victory	
Battle of Sanita-al-Uqab	634		Byzantine Empire	Victory	
Battle of Bosra	June–July 634		Ghassanid Kingdom; Byzantine Empire	Victory	^{,}^{,}
Battle of Ajnadayn	July 30, 634	August 634	Byzantine Empire	Victory	^{,}^{,}
Battle of Fahl	December 634	January 635	Byzantine Empire	Victory	^{,}^{,}

== Umar ibn al-Khattab (634–644) ==
Battle	Date		Opponents	Result	Sources
Battle	Start	End	Opponents	Result	Sources
Muslim conquest of Persia
Battle of Namaraq	634		Sassanian Empire	Victory	^{,}^{,}
Battle of Kaskar	634		Sassanian Empire	Victory	^{,}^{,}
Battle of Saqatia	634		Sassanian Empire	Victory	^{,}^{,}
Battle of the Bridge	October 13, 634		Sassanian Empire	Defeat	^{,}^{,}
Battle of Buwaib	November 635		Sassanian Empire	Victory	^{,}^{,}
Battle of al-Qadisiyya	November 16, 636	November 19, 636	Sassanian Empire	Victory	^{,}^{,}
Battle of Burs	636		Sassanian Empire	Victory	^{,}^{,}
2nd Battle of Babylon	December 636		Sassanian Empire	Victory	^{,}^{,}
Battle of Sura	636	637	Sassanian Empire	Victory	^{,}^{,}
Battle of Deir Kab	636	637	Sassanian Empire	Victory	^{,}^{,}
Battle of Kusa	January 637		Sassanian Empire	Victory	^{,}^{,}
Siege of Ctesiphon	January 637	March 637	Sassanian Empire	Victory	^{,}^{,}
Battle of Jalula	April 637		Sassanian Empire	Victory	^{,}^{,}
First Hormizd-Ardashir battle	637/38		Sassanian Empire	Victory	
Second Hormizd-Ardashir battle	638		Sassanian Empire	Victory	
Ram-Hormizd battle	between 638 and 641		Sassanian Empire	Victory	
Battle of Nahavand	642		Sassanian Empire	Victory	^{,}^{,}
Siege of Gundishapur	642		Sassanian Empire	Victory	
Siege of Shushtar	641	642	Sassanian Empire	Victory	^{,}^{,}
Battle of Ispahan	642		Sassanian Empire	Victory	^{,}^{,}
Battle of Waj Rudh	643		Sassanian Empire	Victory	^{,}^{,}
Battle of Bayrudh	643/4		Sassanian Empire	Victory	
Battle of Bishapur (643–644)	643–644		Sassanian Empire	Victory	^{,}
Conquest of Sistan	643–665		Sassanian Empire; Nezak Huns	Victory	
Byzantine–Arab Wars
Battle of Marj al-Dibaj	September 634		Byzantine Empire	Victory	^{,}
Siege of Damascus	September 634	September 4, 635	Byzantine Empire	Victory	^{,}^{,}
Battle of Marj al-Saffar	January 23, 635		Byzantine Empire	Victory	^{,}^{,}
Battle of Marj ar-Rum	March 635		Byzantine Empire	Victory	^{,}^{,}
1st Siege of Emesa / Homs	December 635	January 636	Byzantine Empire	Victory	^{,}^{,}
Battle of Yarmouk	August 15, 636	August 20, 636	Byzantine Empire; Ghassanid Kingdom	Victory	^{,}^{,}
Siege of Jerusalem	January 637	End of April 637	Byzantine Empire	Victory	^{,}^{,}
Battle of Qinnasrin	637		Byzantine Empire	Victory	^{,}^{,}
Battle of Hazir	June 637		Byzantine Empire	Victory	^{,}^{,}^{,}
Siege of Aleppo	June 637	October 637	Byzantine Empire	Victory	^{,}^{,}
Battle of the Iron Bridge	October 30, 637		Byzantine Empire	Victory	^{,}^{,}
2nd Siege of Emesa / Homs	638		Byzantine Empire	Victory	^{,}^{,}
Siege of Latakia / Laodicea	638		Byzantine Empire	Victory	^{,}^{,}
Siege of Germanicia	Autumn 638		Byzantine Empire	Victory	^{,}^{,}
Siege of Pelusium	End of 639	Early 640	Byzantine Empire	Victory	^{,}^{,}
Siege of Bilbeis	March 640		Byzantine Empire	Victory	^{,}^{,}
Battle of Heliopolis	July 640		Byzantine Empire	Victory	^{,}^{,}
Battle of Sebennytos (641)	Late 640 or early 641		Byzantine Empire	Defeat	^{,}
Siege of Babylon Fortress	October 640	April 6, 641	Byzantine Empire	Victory	^{,}^{,}
Siege of Alexandria	June 641	November 641	Byzantine Empire	Victory	^{,}^{,}
Indo-Muslim Wars
Battle of Rasil	Early 644		Rai Dynasty	Victory	^{,}^{,}
Muslim-Makurian Wars
First Battle of Dongola	642		Kingdom of Makuria	Defeat	^{,}^{,}

== Uthman ibn Affan (644–656) ==
Battle	Date		Opponents	Result	Sources
Battle	Start	End	Opponents	Result	Sources
Muslim conquest of Persia
Battle of Kerman	644		Sassanian Empire	Victory	^{,}
Battle of Istakhr	650-651		Sassanian Empire	Victory	
Battle of Ray (651)	651		Sassanian Empire	Victory	
Battle of Oxus River	651		Sassanian Empire; Göktürk Khaganate	Victory	^{,}
Battle of Nishapur	652		Rebels of the House of Karen	Victory	^{,}^{,}
Siege of Herat	652		Rebels of the House of Karen; Hephthalites	Victory	^{,}^{,}
Battle of Badghis	654		Rebels of the House of Karen; Hephthalites	Victory	
Byzantine–Arab Wars
Siege of Theodosiopolis	645/646		Byzantine Empire; Khazar Khaganate	Victory	
Siege of Dvin	645/646		Byzantine Empire	Victory	
Battle of Nikiou	646		Byzantine Empire	Victory	^{,}^{,}
Battle of Sufetula	647		Byzantine Empire	Victory	^{,}^{,}
Battle of Caesarea	Summer 654 or 655		Byzantine Empire	Defeat	
Battle of the Masts	655		Byzantine Empire	Victory	^{,}^{,}
Muslim-Makurian Wars
Second Battle of Dongola	651	652	Kingdom of Makuria	Defeat	^{,}^{,}
First Khazar-Arab War
Battle of Balanjar (652)	652		Khazar Khaganate	Defeat	

== Ali ibn Abi Talib (656–661) ==
Battle	Date		Opponents	Result	Sources
Battle	Start	End	Opponents	Result	Sources
First Fitna
Battle of the Camel	4 December 656		Uthmaniyya of Aisha	Victory	^{,}^{,}
Battle of Siffin	July 657		Umayyad Syria	Indecisive	^{,}^{,}
Battle of Nahrawan	17 July 658		Kharijites	Victory	^{,}^{,}

== Sources ==
All sources
- The Rashidun Caliphate by le Sultan-ul-Ashiqeen Sultan Mohammad Najib-ur-Rehmn - 2022
- History of Islam: Classical period, 571-1258 C.E by Masudul Hasan - 1998
- Decline of Muslim States and Societies by Misbah Islam - 2008
- The Sword of Allah by A. I. Akram - 2006
- Cults by Natacha Tormey - 2017
- ABU BAKR AL -SEDDEQ THE FIRST CALIPH by MOHAMMAD RIDA - 2008
- The Yemen in Early Islam (630-847) by Abd al Muhsin Mad'aj Mad'aj, ʿAbd-al-Muhsin M. Al-Mad'aj, Abd al-Muhsin Madʼaj M. Madʼaj, Abd al Muhsin Mad'aj al- Mad'aj Abd - 1988
- Concise History of Islam by Muzaffar Husain Syed, Syed Saud Akhtar, B D Usmani - 2011
- TheCompletePilgrim by Howard Kramer - 2015
- The War of the Three Gods by Peter Crawford - 2013
- The Desert Frontier of Arabia Al-Jawf Through the Ages by ʻAbd al-Raḥmān ibn Aḥmad ibn Muḥammad Sudayrī, ʻAbd al-Raḥmān al-Sudairī Foundation - 1995
- The History of White People by Hamma Mirwaisi - 2020
- L'Islam dans tous ses Etats by X -2021
- Understanding Afghanistan by Abdul Qayyum - 2021
- Masters of Warfare by Eric G. L. Pinzelli - 2022
- Medieval Wars 500–1500 by Dennis Showalter - 2012
- The History of the Kurdish People by Hamma Mirwaisi - 2020
- War and Religion: An Encyclopedia of Faith and Conflict [3 Volumes] by X - 2017
- The History of Al-Tabari Vol. 11 by Khalid Yahya Blankinship - 2015
- The Legacy of Jihad by Andrew Bostom - 2010
- Palmyra After Zenobia AD 273-750 by Emanuele E. Intagliata - 2018
- Saudi Arabia The Shape of a Client Feudalism by Geoff Simons - 2016
- History of Islam: Classical period, 571-1258 C.E by Masudul Hasan - 1998
- Concise History of Islam by Muzaffar Husain Syed, Syed Saud Akhtar, B D Usmani - 2011
- L'islam de Pétra Réponse à la thèse de Dan Gibson by X - 2020
- You Sorry You Asked by Albert L. Masler, Jr. - 2002
- Islam at War by George F. Nafziger, Mark W. Walton - 2003
- Outline History of the Islamic World by Masudul Hasan, Abdul Waheed - 1974
- Middle East Conflicts from Ancient Egypt to the 21st Century: An Encyclopedia and Document Collection [4 Volumes] by Spencer C. Tucker - 2019
- The Cambridge History of Iran by Ilya Gershevitch, R. N. Frye, William Bayne Fisher - 1968
- Muhammad the Prophet of Peace & Reconciliation Followed by His Khulifa-E-Rashdun Abubakr - 2017
- AL FAROUK OMAR IBN AL-KHATTAB THE SECOND CALIPH by MOHAMMAD RIDA - 2007
- Politische Soziologie der sozialen Ungleichheit by Reinhard Kreckel - 1992
- The History of Al-Tabari Vol. 11 by Khalid Yahya Blankinship - 1993
- Une histoire de l'Église by Angela Pellicciari, Esther Barbier - 2016
- Les Campagnes d'Orient et les intérêts de l'Entente by Charles Stiénon - 2016
- Abu Bakr The Caliph by Abdul Aziz - 1978
- Conflict and Conquest in the Islamic World by Alexander Mikaberidze - 2011
- Dubai The Story of the World's Fastest City by Jim Krane - 2009
- The Countries And Tribes Of The Persian Gulf - Volume 1 by Samuel Barrett Miles - 2020
- THE KINGDOM OF HAZRAT ABU BAKR (R.A) - The First Muslim Caliph by Dr. Iftekhar Ahmed Shams - 2023
- How the West Was Won and Lost by Rocky M. Mirza, PhD - 2016
- Histoire de l'islam by Stanford Mc Krause, Yuri Galbinst, Willem Brownstok
- The Oxford Handbook of Iranian History by Touraj Daryaee - 2012
- ABDULLAH OCALAN by Hamma Mirwaisi - 2020
- E.J. Brill's First Encyclopaedia of Islam, 1913-1936 Volume 1 by Martijn Theodoor Houtsma - 1987
- A History of Babylon by X - 2008
- Witnesses to a World CrisisHistorians and Histories of the Middle East in the Seventh Century by James Howard-Johnston - 2010
- Hadrat Umar Farooq Allahʻs Blessings be Upon Him by Masudul Hasan - 1997
- The Armies of Ancient Persia, The Sassanians by Kaveh Farrokh - 2014
- De l’expansion Arabo-Islamique à la conquête turco-ottomane (640–1517) by Jawad Boulos - 2021
- Lebanon and Turkey - Historical Contexts and Contemporary Realities by Robert G. Rabil - 2023
- 50 Great Military Leaders of All Time by Jann Tibbetts - 2016
- The Soul of Ancient Egypt - Restoring the Spiritual Engine of the World by Robert Bauval, Ahmed Osman - 2015
- Battle of Tours by John C. Scott - 2013
- The First Thousand Years - A Global History of Christianity by Robert Louis Wilken - 2012
- The last Sibylline oracle of Alexandria, Oracula Sibyllina xiv, 284-361. [3 pt. Extr. from The Class. quarterly, vol.9,10]. by Walter Scott - 1915
- A History of the Crusades - Volume 1 by Steven Runciman - 1987
- Cairo - Histories of a City by Nezar AlSayyad - 2013
- Seeing Islam As Others Saw It - A Survey and Evaluation of Christian, Jewish and Zoroastrian Writings on Early Islam by Robert G. Hoyland - 2013
- From Muhammad to Bin Laden - Religious and Ideological Sources of the Homicide Bombers Phenomenon by David Bukay - 2017
- 50 Great Military Leaders of All Time by Jann Tibbetts - 2016
- Rabi'a From Narrative to Myth by Rkia Elaroui Cornell - 2019
- Letters by Nursi - 2008
- A Guide to Battles Decisive Conflicts in History by Richard Holmes - 2006
- Military History of Late Rome 602–641 by Ilkka Syvänne - 2022
- The Battle of Al-Qādisiyyah and the Conquest of Syria and Palestine - A.D. 635-637/A.H. 14-15 by Ṭabarī - 1992
- The Early Islamic Conquests by Fred M. Donner - 2014
- War Victims and the Right to a City by Hind Al-Shoubaki - 2022
- Masters of War - A Visual History of Military Personnel from Commanders to Frontline Fighters by Marc Pattenden - 2021
- A History of Palestine, 634-1099 by Moshe Gil - 1997
- Jerusalem Falls - Seven Centuries of War and Peace by John D. Hosler - 2022
- The New Roman Empire - A History of Byzantium by Anthony Kaldellis - 2024
- Byzantium and Islam by Daniel J. Sahas - 2021
- Petit atlas historique du Moyen Âge - 2^{e} éd. by Jean-Marc Albert - 2018
- Damascus - A History by Ross Burns - 2019
- The History of Syria by John A. Shoup - 2018
- The Twilight Of Egypt by Moustafa Gadalla
- African Empires: Volume 1 by J.P. Martin - 2016
- The Nubians of West Aswan by Anne M. Jennings - 1995
- An Encyclopedia of Battles by David Eggenberger - 1985
- Évêques, moines et empereurs (610-1054) by Jean-Marie Mayeur, André Vauchez, Luce Pietri, Marc Venard - 2000
- Terrorısme Et Attentats Suıcıdes: Une Perspectıve Islamıque by Ergün Çapan - 2014
- Faith, Growth and Success by Thami J. Khalil - 2016
- Seventy Weeks Prophecy: How the Bible Foretold the Year Jesus(As) and Muhammad(Saw) Will Come on Earth by Pedro C. Arceno Jr - 2020
- Essai sur l'histoire des arabes avant l'islamisme, pendant l'époque de Mahomet, et jusqu'à la reduction de toutes les tribus sous la loi musulmane by A. P. Caussin De Perceval - 1848
- History of the Arab Invasions: The Conquest of the Lands by Ahmad b. Yahya al-Baladhuri - 2022
- Byzantium and the Early Islamic Conquests by Walter Emil Kaegi - 1995
- History of the Coptic Orthodox People and the Church of Egypt by Robert Morgan - 2016
- La Libye by PINTA Pierre - 2005
- Dictionary of Battles and Sieges [3 Volumes] by Tony Jaques - 2006
- Encyclopedia of Islamic Civilization and Religion by Ian Netton - 2013
- Islam for Nerds by Gerald Drissner - 2016
- Tableau chronologique de l'histoire du moyen âge by Chrysanthe-Ovide Des Michels - 1823
- Manuel de l'histoire générale du monde, destiné a l'enseignement moyen by Joseph Gantrelle - 1838
- En terre d'Islam by X - 1948
- A History of Early Islam by Mazhar-ul-Haq - 1960
- The Islamic Middle East, 700-1900 by Abraham Udovitch - 1981
- International Dictionary of Historic Places: Northern Europe - Volume 2 - 1995 by Trudy Ring, Paul E. Schellinger, Noelle Watson
- The heritage of the Kingdom of Saudi Arabia by Wahbi Hariri-Rifai, Mokhless Hariri-Rifai - 1990
- Syrian Civil War by Robert M. Kerr - 2020
- The Politics and Culture of an Umayyad Tribe by Mohammad Rihan - 2014
- Medieval Islamic Civilization - An Encyclopedia by Josef Meri - 2005
- La Nouvelle Histoire du Monde by Laurent Testot - 2019
- Iran, une histoire de 4000 ans by Yves Bomati, Houchang Nahavandi - 2019
- Religious Speciation by Ina Wunn, Davina Grojnowski - 2019
- L’ibadisme dans les sociétés de l’Islam médiéval by Cyrille Aillet - 2018
- Lire et interpréter by Anne-Laure Zwilling, Nehmetallah Abi-Rached - 2013
- The Clash of Civilizations by Allan Trawinski - 2017
- Conflicts that Changed the World by Rodney Castleden - 2008
- Annales africaines by Université de Dakar. Faculté de droit et des sciences économiques - 1959
- Islamisation de l'Asie Centrale by Étienne de La Vaissière - 2008
- Greater Khorasan by Rocco Rante - 2015
- Les céramiques Buff de Nishapur by Sheila Samavaki - 2021
- Faiths Across Time [4 Volumes] by J. Gordon Melton - 2014
- India's Struggle by Therlee Gipson - 2019
- Religious Minorities' Migration from Iran by S. Behnaz Hosseini - 2023
- Meurtre à la mosquée - Les califes maudits - Volume 3 by Hela Ouardi - 2021
- L’Orient islamique face à l’Occident by Claude-Gilbert Dubois - 2011
- L'idéologie omeyyade by Gabriel Martinez-Gros - 1992
- Les figures du compromis dans les sociétés islamiques by Mohamed Nachi - 2011
- Decline and Fall of the Sasanian Empire by Parvaneh Pourshariati - 2017
- The Forgotten Church by Debabrata Maulik - 2020
- Les grandes figures de l'Iran by Houchang Nahavandi, Yves Bomati - 2015
- Encyclopédie des gens du monde by X - 1841
- The History of Al-Ṭabarī Vol. 14 by Al-Tabari - 2015
- Tunisie by Salah Riza - 2008
- Cahiers du centenaire de l'Algérie. [no.] 1-12 - Volume 1 by Comité national métropolitain du centenaire de l'Algérie - 1930
- La Tunisie antique et islamique - Patrimoine archéologique tunisien by Samir Guizani, Mohamed Ghodhbane, Xavier Delestre - 2018
- Citadel of Shia Imams by Mahboob Illahi - 2020
- La Grande Stratégie de l’empire byzantin by Edward N. Luttwak - 2010
- War and Religion by X - 1927
- Enduring Controversies in Military History [2 Volumes] by Spencer Tucker - 2017
- The Sea in World History [2 Volumes] by Stephen K. Stein - 2017
- Promises of Betrayals - The History That Shaped the Iranian Shia Clerics by Fazle Chowdhury - 2018
- Science diplomacy and transboundary water management -the Orontes River case by Ballabio, R. - 2015
- Marcus Simaika - Father of Coptic Archaeology by Samir Simaika, Nevine Henein - 2017
- Between Constantinople, the Papacy, and the Caliphate -The Melkite Church in the Islamicate World, 634-969 by Krzysztof Kościelniak - 2022
- Egypt After the Pharaohs, 332 BC-AD 642 - From Alexander to the Arab Conquest by Alan K. Bowman - 1996* Meurtre à la mosquée - Les califes maudits - Volume 3 by Hela Ouardi - 2021
- L’Orient islamique face à l’Occident by Claude-Gilbert Dubois - 2011
- L'idéologie omeyyade by Gabriel Martinez-Gros - 1992
- Les figures du compromis dans les sociétés islamiques by Mohamed Nachi - 2011
- Decline and Fall of the Sasanian Empire by Parvaneh Pourshariati - 2017
- The Forgotten Church by Debabrata Maulik - 2020
- Les grandes figures de l'Iran by Houchang Nahavandi, Yves Bomati - 2015
- Encyclopédie des gens du monde by X - 1841
- The History of Al-Ṭabarī Vol. 14 by Al-Tabari - 2015
- Tunisie by Salah Riza - 2008
- Cahiers du centenaire de l'Algérie. [no.] 1-12 - Volume 1 by Comité national métropolitain du centenaire de l'Algérie - 1930
- La Tunisie antique et islamique - Patrimoine archéologique tunisien by Samir Guizani, Mohamed Ghodhbane, Xavier Delestre - 2018
- Citadel of Shia Imams by Mahboob Illahi - 2020
- La Grande Stratégie de l’empire byzantin by Edward N. Luttwak - 2010
- War and Religion by X - 1927
- Enduring Controversies in Military History [2 Volumes] by Spencer Tucker - 2017
- The Sea in World History [2 Volumes] by Stephen K. Stein - 2017
- Promises of Betrayals - The History That Shaped the Iranian Shia Clerics by Fazle Chowdhury - 2018
- Science diplomacy and transboundary water management -the Orontes River case by Ballabio, R. - 2015
- Marcus Simaika - Father of Coptic Archaeology by Samir Simaika, Nevine Henein - 2017
- Between Constantinople, the Papacy, and the Caliphate -The Melkite Church in the Islamicate World, 634-969 by Krzysztof Kościelniak - 2022
- Egypt After the Pharaohs, 332 BC-AD 642 - From Alexander to the Arab Conquest by Alan K. Bowman - 1996
- History of the Coptic Orthodox People and the Church of Egypt by Robert Morgan - 2016
- The Cambridge Medieval History Series volumes 1-5 by J.B. Bury
- A Military History of Africa - [3 Volumes] by Timothy J. Stapleton - 2013
- Byzantium in the Seventh Century: 634-641 by Andreas Nikolaou Stratos - 1972
