= Battle of Abraq =

632 event in the Nejd region, Saudi Arabia

Battle of Abraq أبرق
- Part of Wars of Apostasy
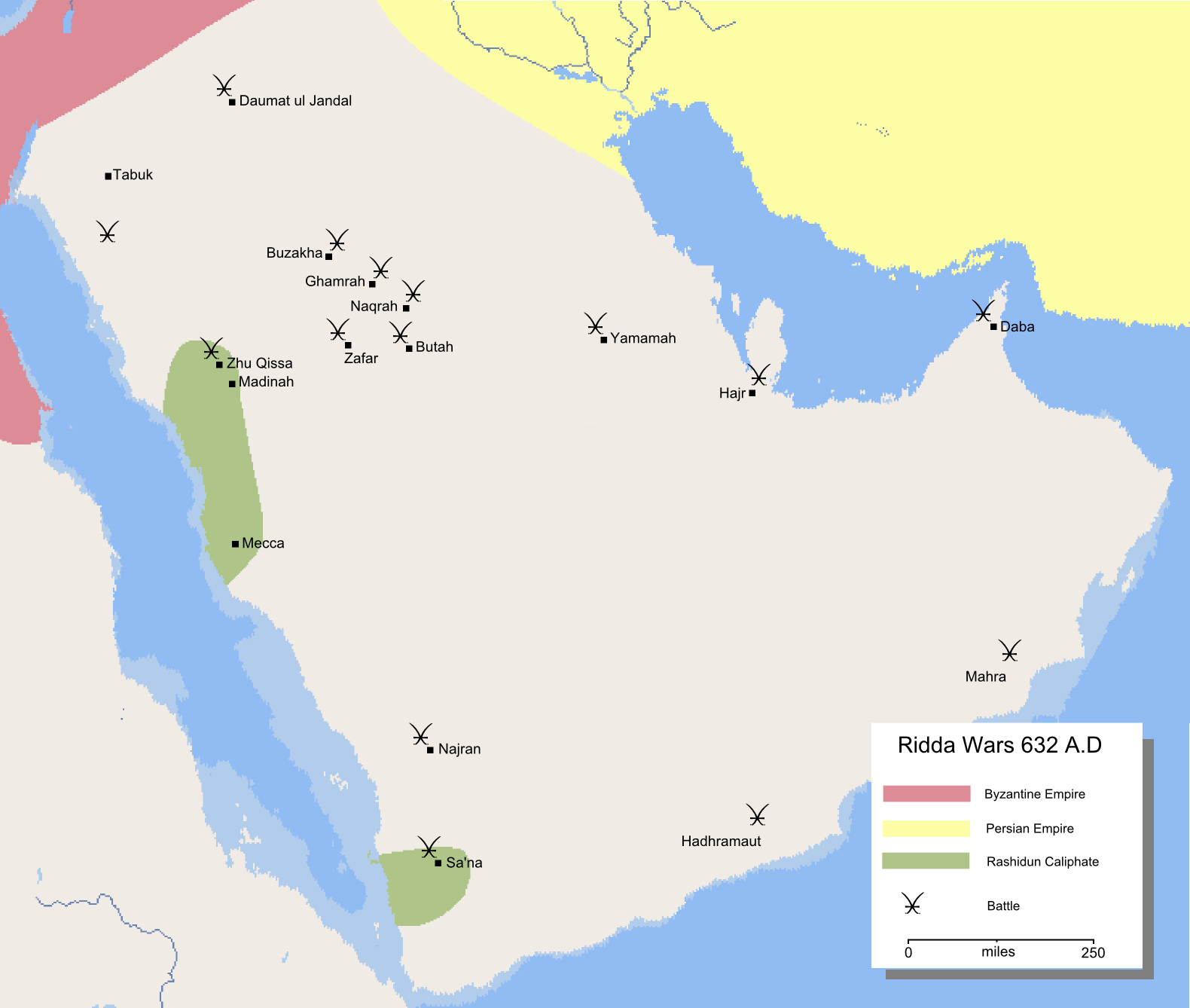
- Map showing all the battles during the Wars of Apostasy in the Arabian Peninsula, where Abraq, not visible, is near "Zhu Qissa."
Date	Mid–August 632^{,} (Note: On 4 August 632, the army of Usama ibn Zayd returned to Medina (cf. Expedition of Usama bin Ziyad). On 15 August 632 (or the third week of Jumada al-awwal), Abu Bakr As-Siddiq led the forces of Usama ibn Zayd to Dhul Al-Qassah to join the troops of Al-Nu'man ibn Muqrin, then led the Rashidun forces towards Abraq.)
Location	Abraq, Arabia (Note: Abraq was a place affiliated with the Banu Dhubyan tribe in the Nejd region and is now a rocky and steep promontory located 8 km north of Al Hinakiyah.) 24.8398°N 39.5034°E
Result	Decisive Rashidun victory^{,}^{,}
Territorial changes	Abraq brought under the control of the Rashidun Caliphate^{,}^{,}

Belligerents
Rashidun Caliphate	Rebellious Arab tribes; Banu Abs; Tayy; Banu Hawāzin; Banu Asad; Banu Dhubyan; Banu Subay'; Banu Bakr ibn Abd Manat

Commanders and leaders
Abu Bakr; Al-Nu'man ibn Muqrin (Note: According to Muhammad ibn Jarir al-Tabari, Al-Nu'man ibn Muqrin did not participate in the battle of Abraq, but according to Agha Ibrahim Akram, he did.); Suwaid ibn Muqrin; Abdullah ibn Muqrin	Hibal ibn Khuwailid (Note: According to Muhammad ibn Jarir al-Tabari, Hibal ibn Khuwailid died during the battle of Dhu al-Qassah, which preceded Abraq. However, according to Agha Ibrahim Akram, Zhaenal Fanani, or Mohammed Reda, Hibal ibn Khuwailid was not killed in Dhu al-Qassah and was present at the battle of Abraq.); Awf ibn Fulan ibn Sinan †; Al-Harith ibn Fulan †; Al-Hutay'ah (POW)

Strength
Unknown, but fewer than the enemy	Unknown, but more than the enemy

Casualties and losses
Unknown	Unknown

The Battle of Abraq occurred in the Abraq area, situated approximately 8 kilometres (5.0 miles) north of Al Hinakiyah. It is within the Nejd region, a central-western part of Saudi Arabia, and the battle took place in mid-August of the year 632. It battled the forces of the Rashidun Caliphate, led by Caliph Abu Bakr, against rebellious Arab tribes led, according to Agha Ali Ibrahim Akram, by General Hibal ibn Khuwailid. (Note: Brother of Tulayha ibn Khuwaylid)

This victory for the Rashidun Caliphate marked the end of defensive operations for Medina, and the beginning of large-scale offensive attack throughout the Arabian Peninsula by Abu Bakr and the regrouping of the defeated tribes that fled the battle into a unified force at Buzakha.

== Background ==
After their defeat at the Battle of Dhu al-Qassah, several rebellious Arab tribes turned violently against their fellow tribesmen who had remained loyal to Islam, killing them.

After learning the outcome of the battle, Arab tribes living near Medina clarified their neutral status. Many tribes sent delegations to Medina, pledging allegiance to the authorities and paying the zakat. Meanwhile, the tribes opposed to Islam openly declared their apostasy. As the situation became more pressing, the zakat began arriving at Medina that same night, brought first by Safwan bin Safwan ibn Tamimi, then by Al-Zabarqan ibn Badr, and finally by Adi ibn Hatim. Safwan bin Safwan ibn Tamimi arrived at the beginning of the night, Al-Zabarqan Bin Badr arrived in the middle of the night, and Adi ibn Hatim at the end.

A few days later, on August 4, 632, (Note: The date August 2, 632, is given by Agha Ibrahim Akram in his work Khalid Bin Al-Waleed: Sword Of Allah by A. I. Akram) the army of Usama ibn Zayd returned to Medina after a successful expedition.

The spoils obtained from this expedition, combined with the zakat, greatly helped strengthen the financial base of the Rashidun Caliphate, providing a solid foundation to meet the military needs against the enemies of the Rashidun Caliphate.

== Forces ==
=== Rashidun Caliphate ===
The exact strength of the Rashidun Caliphate forces during the battle are currently unknown. However, available information indicates that they were numerically inferior to the rebellious tribes.

=== Arab tribes ===
The exact strength of the rebellious tribes is currently unknown to this day, but it is established that they were more numerous than the forces of the Rashidun Caliphate. The tribes that participated in the battle are clearly identified, as follows:

According to Muhammad ibn Jarir al-Tabari, Agha Ali Ibrahim Akram, and Zhaenal Fanani, these tribes participated:
Banu Asad	Banu Ghatafan; Banu Dhubyan^{,}; Banu Abs^{,}	Tayy
Banu Hawāzin	Banu Kinanah; Banu Bakr ibn Abd Manat	Banu Subay'

== Build up ==
=== According to Agha Ibrahim Akram ===
According to the account of Agha Ibrahim Akram in his book The Sword Of Allah, (Note: Khalid Bin Al-Waleed: Sword Of Allah by A. I. Akram - 2009) after the Battle of Dhu al-Qassah, Abu Bakr decided to delay a general offensive to allow Usama ibn Zayd's army to rest and re-equip. Meanwhile, he worked to form a new army in Medina. Although this force was assembled quickly, it was a formidable army. Abu Bakr then considered launching a campaign against the rebellious Arab tribes gathered at Abraq and prepared for war.

When he announced his intention to personally lead the army, some Muslims tried to dissuade him:

May God bless you, Caliph of the Messenger of God! Do not risk your life by leading the army yourself. If you are killed, it would disrupt the order of things. Appoint another to lead the army. Then, if he is killed, you can appoint another.

Determined, Abu Bakr believed there was no better way to inspire his troops than to lead by example. He responded:

No, by Allah! I will not do that. I will not burden others with my responsibility.

Under his leadership, the army marched towards Dhu al-Qassah. where they were joined by Al-Nu'man ibn Muqrin. Abdullah ibn Muqrin and Suwaid ibn Muqrin reoccupied the strategic positions they had held during the Battle of Dhu al-Qassah: Al-Nu'man ibn Muqrin commanded the right wing, Abdullah ibn Muqrin the left wing, and Suwaid ibn Muqrin the rear guard. After arriving at Dhu al-Qassah, the army then proceeded towards Abraq. This was in the second week of August 632 AD, corresponding to the third week of Joumada al-Oula in the year 632 AH.

=== According to Muhammad ibn Jarir al-Tabari ===
In his book The History of al-Tabari Vol. 10: The Conquest of Arabia, (Note: The History of al-Tabari Vol. 10: The Conquest of Arabia: The Riddah Wars A.D. 632-633/A.H. by Muhammad ibn Jarir al-Tabari - 1993) al-Tabari reports that after the Battle of Dhu al-Qassah, Abu Bakr As-Siddiq ordered Usama ibn Zayd's troops to rest, and then left the charge of Medina to Usama ibn Zayd. He said:

Rest yourselves, and rest your mounts.

He then prepared a new expedition against the rebellious tribes at Abraq. Several companions, concerned for his safety, said to him:

O Caliph of the Messenger of God, we beg you by God not to expose yourself to battle, for if you were struck, there would be no order among the people. It would be harder on the enemy if you stayed here. Send a man in your place; if he is struck, you can appoint another to command.

Abu Bakr, determined, firmly rejected this suggestion and replied:

No, by Allah! I will not do that; I will show you the example myself.

He then led his army towards Dhu al-Qassah. With Abdullah ibn Muqrin and Suwaid ibn Muqrin occupying their usual positions: Abdullah ibn Muqrin commanded the left flank and Suwaid ibn Muqrin the rear guard. As for their third brother, Al-Nu'man ibn Muqrin, he was left at Dhu al-Qassah to hold his position.

The army then continued its march towards Abraq.

== Battle ==
=== According to Agha Ibrahim Akram ===
Upon arriving at Abraq, the forces of the Rashidun Caliphate found that the rebellious Arab tribes were already in combat positions. Caliph Abu Bakr quickly deployed his army and launched an offensive against the insurgents.

The morale of the rebels at Abraq was affected by the arrival of the survivors of the Battle of Dhu al-Qassah, who had recently been defeated, which weakened their resolve to continue the rebellion. Although they were numerically superior, the rebels held out for some time before dispersing and fleeing to Buzakha, (Note: Buzakha, a water source belonging to the Banu Asad, located in the Nejd region in present-day Saudi Arabia.) where Tulayha ibn Khuwaylid had established his base after departing Samir'a. This victory marked another success for the Rashidun Caliphate.

=== According to Muhammad ibn Jarir al-Tabari ===
Abu Bakr traveled to Al-Rabadha, where he met the Banu Abs, the Banu Dhubyan, as well as a group of Banu Bakr ibn Abd Manat. There, they clashed at al-Abraq. Al-Harith ibn Fulan, a member of the Banu Subay', and Awf ibn Fulan ibn Sinan were killed in the fighting, while Al-Hutay'ah was taken prisoner. The Banu Abs and Banu Bakr ibn Abd Manat tribes fled, marking the defeat of the rebellious Arab tribes.

Regarding the Battle of Abraq, Ziyad ibn Hanzalah al-Tamimi said:

How many battles did we fight at al-Abraq against the furious Dhubyan ? (Note: This refers to the Banu Dhubyan) We inflicted a heavy defeat on them with the help of the Truthful One. (Note: The term "Truthful One" here refers to Abu Bakr, known as Al-Siddiq. The epithet "Al-Siddiq," meaning "The Truthful," has been and remains associated with Abu Bakr)

== Aftermath ==
=== According to Agha Ibrahim Akram ===
After the battle, Abu Bakr deployed several columns of the army to pacify the surrounding regions. Taxes were collected following these operations, and the repentant clans offered gifts, which were accepted, and the next day, the caliph left Abraq to return to Medina.

=== According to Muhammad ibn Jarir al-Tabari ===
After the battle, Abu Bakr stayed in Abraq for a few days. The Banu Dhubyan, who dominated the region, were dispossessed of this land after Abu Bakr declared:

It is now forbidden for the Banu Dhubyan to control this region, as God has given it to us as spoils.

Abraq was then reserved for the horses of the Muslims, while the rest of the land in Al-Rabadha was turned into pasture for the people. After the defeat of the rebellious Arab tribes, the Banu Tha'labah (Note: The Banu Tha'labah are a branch of the Banu Dhubyan.) tried to resettle on this land but were prevented from doing so. They went to Medina to protest, claiming that the land belonged to them and asking:

Why are we being prevented from camping in our country?

Abu Bakr replied:

You lie; it is not your land, but a gift that was returned to me after being stolen.

He refused their request and granted them no favor.

== Outcome and consequences ==
Although numerically superior, the rebellious Arab tribes were weakened and unable to continue the rebellion due to their defeat at the Battle of Dhu al-Qassah. The strategy of Abu Bakr, combining direct attacks and skilled maneuvers, disorganized the forces of the Arab rebels, leading to the flight of some tribes and the victory of the Rashidun Caliphate.

The battle fought against the rebellious tribes at Abraq aimed primarily to prevent any threat to Medina and to dissuade the rebellious Arab tribes from launching new offensives. Another consequence of this victory was that Abu Bakr began preparing a major campaign to reestablish the control of the Rashidun Caliphate across the entire Arabian Peninsula. Furthermore, the lands of Abraq, which had previously been under the control of the Banu Dhubyan, were confiscated by Abu Bakr and turned into state grazing land for animals. Finally, the defeated rebellious tribes regrouped around Tulayha ibn Khuwaylid at Samir'a.

== See also ==
- List of battles of the Rashidun Caliphate
- Battle of Dhul al-Qassah
- Ridda wars
