= Battle of Dhu al-Qassah =

632 Rashidun Caliphate victory east of Medina

Battle of Dhu al-Qassah معركة ذو قِصّة
- Part of Ridda wars
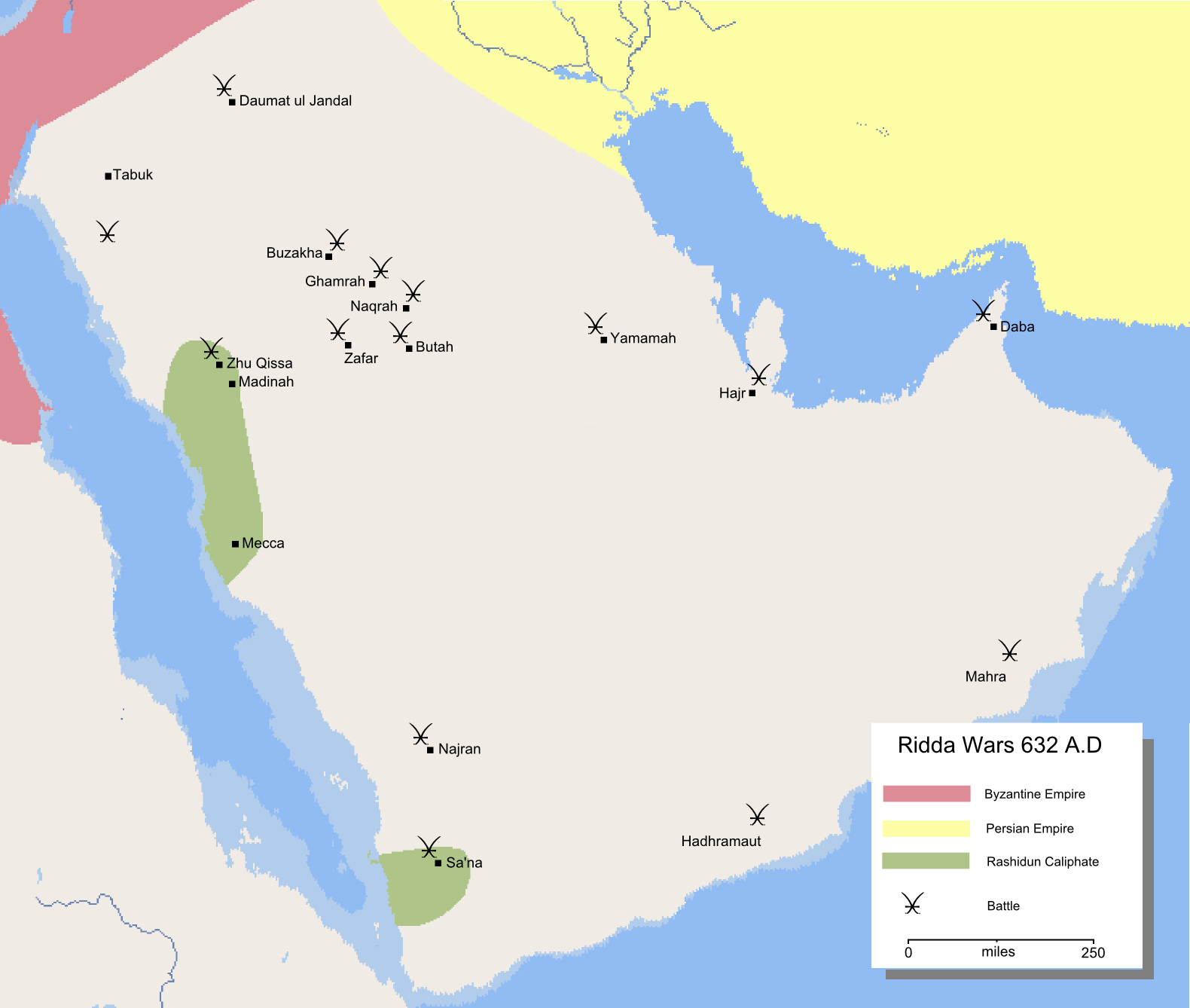
- Map showing the most decisive battles during the Wars of Apostasy in the Arabian Peninsula, where Dhu al-Qassah is visible.
Date	25 – 30 July 632^{,} (5 Days)
Location	Province of Medina, Arabia (Note: The location of the battle is not singular, as it took place in Medina, Dhu Husa, and Dhu al-Qassah.) 24.467°N 40.0°E
Result	Rashidun victory
Territorial changes	Dhul Qissa is retaken by the Rashidun Caliphate

Belligerents
Rashidun Caliphate	Rebel Arab tribes; Banu Asad; Banu Ghatafan; Banu Kinanah; Tayy; Banu Hawāzin; Banu Subay'

Commanders and leaders
Abu Bakr; Khalid ibn al-Walid; Zubayr ibn al-Awwam; Ali ibn Abi Talib; Talha ibn Ubayd Allah; Abd Allah ibn Mas'ud; Al-Nu'man ibn Muqarrin; Abd al-Rahman ibn Awf; Suwayd ibn Muqarrin; Abd Allah ibn Muqarrin	Hibal ibn Khuwailid (Note: According to Agha Ali Ibrahim Akram, Hibal ibn Khuwailid did not die in combat during this battle, but according to Muhammad ibn Jarir al-Tabari, Hibal ibn Khuwailid did die in combat.)

Strength
Unknown but less than the enemy	Unknown but more than the enemy

Casualties and losses
Unknown	Heavy

The Battle of Dhu al-Qassah took place in the area of Dhu al-Qassah, located approximately 36 kilometres (22 mi) east of Medina, in the Medina Province, in the central-western part of Saudi Arabia, from 25 to 30 July 632. It pitted the forces of the Rashidun Caliphate led by the Caliph Abu Bakr against the rebel apostates led by General Hibal ibn Khuwailid. (Note: Brother of Tulayha ibn Khuwaylid.)

This battle, comprising four engagements resulted in a victory for the Rashidun Caliphate, marking the beginning of the Wars of Apostasy, the withdrawal of the apostate rebels to the Abraq area (Note: A place associated with the Banu Dhubyan tribe in the Nejd region of Saudi Arabia, now a steep rocky promontory located 8 kilometres (5.0 mi) north of Al Hinakiyah.) and a consolidation of Abu Bakr As-Siddiq's legitimacy in his new role as caliph.

== Background ==
=== Situation following the death of Muhammad ===
After the death of the Islamic prophet Muhammad, on June 8, 632, Abu Bakr was appointed as his successor to lead the newly emerging state. However, the tribes of the Arabian Peninsula, which had mostly submitted and become Muslim under Muhammad from 631 (Note: The Year of Delegations in 631 marked the peak of Muhammad's power. The seventy tribes that entered into agreements with him sent emissaries to Medina to confirm their subjugation.) abandoned Islam after his death, expelled the Zakat collectors, and triggered widespread apostasy affecting all the tribes of Arabia with the notable exception of the inhabitants of Mecca, Medina, and the Banu Thaqif of Ta'if. Some clans entirely renounced the faith, while others were divided between those who abandoned the belief and those who remained loyal. (Note: Muhammad ibn Jarir al-Tabari explains in his book (The History of al-Tabari Volume 10: The Conquest of Arabia), page 69: The common people of Tayy and the Banu Asad gathered around Tulayha ibn Khuwaylid, while the Ghatafan apostatized, except for those of Banu Ashja and the leaders of mixed origin groups, who pledged allegiance to him. The Banu Hawāzin remained ambivalent, withholding the payment of Zakat, except for those of Banu Thaqif and their group. The majority of Jadilah and weaker groups followed them. Some members of the Banu Sulaym apostatized, as did the rest of the people in various places.)

Two self-proclaimed prophets, Tulayha ibn Khuwaylid and Musaylima ibn Habib, as well as a false prophetess, Sajah bint Al-Harith, fueled this apostasy. Musaylima had long been known as an impostor, while Tulayha began proclaiming himself a prophet during Muhammad's illness.

The main threat to Medina came from Tulayha ibn Khuwaylid and the tribes of central, western, and northern Arabia that followed him.

According to Agha Ali Ibrahim Akram, these tribes were:
Banu Asad^{,}	Banu Ghatafan^{,}^{,}	Tayy^{,}	Banu Hawāzin^{,}

And according to Muhammad ibn Jarir al-Tabari, these tribes were:
Banu Asad^{,}	Banu Ghatafan^{,}^{,}; Banu Dhubyan^{,}^{,}; Banu Abs^{,}	Tayy^{,}
Banu Hawāzin^{,}	Banu Kinanah; Banu Bakr; Layth; Banu al-Dil; Banu Mudlej	Banu Subay'

== Course of events ==
=== Pre-battle ===
==== According to Agha Ali Ibrahim Akram ====
In his work The Sword Of Allah, (Note: Khalid Bin Al-Waleed Sword Of Allah by A. I. Akram - 2009) Agha Ali Ibrahim Akram relates that about a week or two after the departure of Usama bin Zayd's army, (Note: cf. the expedition of Usama bin Zayd.) delegates from Dhu al-Qassah (Note: The closest concentration of apostates to Medina is in the area of Dhu al-Qassah, about 36 kilometres (22 mi) east of Medina.) came to Caliph Abu Bakr in Medina and declared:

We continue to pray, but we no longer pay the tax^{,}^{,}. (Note: The tax here refers to the Zakat.)

However, Abu Bakr refused this proposal. He responded firmly:

By Allah, if you withhold even an ounce of what is due, I will fight you. I give you one day to give your answer.^{,}^{,}^{,}^{,}. (Note: The exact words spoken by Abu Bakr As-Siddiq remain uncertain, but the meaning is consistent across sources.)

The next morning, before the one-day ultimatum expired, the emissaries discreetly left Medina, signaling their rejection of Abu Bakr's demands^{,}. Shortly after their departure, Abu Bakr sent his own emissaries to all the apostate tribes, urging them to remain faithful to Islam and continue paying their taxes, which did not have the desired effect.

The emissaries from Dhu al-Qassah, observant and attentive, noticed the absence of fighters before leaving Medina^{,}^{,}^{,}. Upon their return, they reported to their compatriots about the conversation with Abu Bakr and the apparent vulnerability of Medina^{,}^{,}^{,}, however, although Usama bin Zayd's main army had not yet returned from its expedition, the city was not as defenseless as they thought, as there were still many able-bodied men, particularly from the Banu Hashim clan, (Note: Clan of Muhammad.) who had stayed behind to mourn their deceased relatives.

Meanwhile, Tulayha ibn Khuwaylid, now in Samira, reinforced the apostates of Dhu al-Qassah with a contingent led by his brother Hibal ibn Khuwailid.

After hearing the reports from the emissaries, the temptation to destroy Medina while it was still vulnerable became too great for the apostates. They then decided to march on the city. From Dhu Husa, (Note: According to Yaqut al-Rumi, Dhu Husa is located about 160 kilometres (99 mi) east of Medina, just west of Al-Rabadha.) where the apostates had established a base, part of the forces from Dhu al-Qassah advanced even closer to Medina in the third week of July 632 and set up camp, preparing to attack the city.

==== According to Muhammad ibn Jarir al-Tabari ====
In his work The History of al-Tabari Vol. 10: The Conquest of Arabia, (Note: The History of al-Tabari Vol. 10: The Conquest of Arabia: The Riddah Wars A.D. 632-633/A.H. by Muhammad ibn Jarir al-Tabari - 1993) Al-Tabari relates that about ten days after the death of the Muhammad, delegations from the apostate tribes of the Banu Asad tribe, reinforced by a contingent of Tulayha ibn Khuwaylid led by Hibal ibn Khuwailid, the Banu Ghatafan, the Banu Hawazin, and the Tayy went to meet Caliph Abu Bakr. Upon their arrival to Medina, they were received by the Muslim leaders, except for Al-Abbas ibn Abd al-Muttalib. These delegations proposed performing the ritual prayer while requesting an exemption from the Zakat. Abu Bakr rejected this proposal, stating:

If they refuse me even the halter of a camel, I will fight them for it^{,}^{,}^{,} (Note: The halter was used on camels, which at that time were the primary means of transporting Zakat. In some cases, the camels themselves were directly considered as Zakat, and it was required that the halters accompanying the camels be given in payment. The term also came to mean, by extension, a year of Zakat itself.)

He issued an ultimatum, giving the delegations one day and one night to accept his conditions^{,}^{,}. (Note: To perform the ritual prayer while paying the Zakat.) After this period, the delegations, having refused the conditions imposed, returned to their respective tribes. Upon their return, they reported the small number of defenders in Medina, thus arousing their compatriots to covet the city and prompting them to prepare for an attack. After expelling the rebel delegations, Abu Bakr then placed men to monitor the mountain passes around Medina^{,}, including Ali ibn Abi Talib, Zubayr ibn al-Awwam, Talha ibn Ubayd Allah, Abd Allah ibn Masud, Khalid ibn al-Walid, and Abd al-Rahman ibn Awf. He then gathered the people of Medina in the mosque and declared to them:

The country has fallen into disbelief. The members of the delegation have observed that you are few in number and that you could be caught off guard in case of an attack, whether by day or night. The nearest enemies are only a stage away from you. They hoped that we would accept their demands and reconcile with them, but we rejected their proposals and annulled their treaty. So prepare yourselves.

As a result, the inhabitants of Medina prepared themselves.

=== Battle ===
==== First confrontation ====
===== According to Agha Ali Ibrahim Akram =====
Abu Bakr was informed of the rebels' movement and immediately began organizing the defense of Medina. The Caliph gathered a fighting force from the remaining men. Ali ibn Abi Talib, Zubayr ibn al-Awwam, Talha ibn Ubayd Allah, and Abd Allah ibn Masud each commanded a part of this new army.

For three days, nothing happened. The apostates, uncertain of where to start, took no action. Abu Bakr then decided, on his order, to have the Muslims leave Medina to launch a swift attack on the apostates' forward camp. This successful offensive pushed the apostates back to Dhu Husa. Informed of this success, Abu Bakr ordered the Muslims to stay in place and await further instructions.

===== According to Muhammad ibn Jarir al-Tabari =====
Less than three days later, the apostate forces launched a nighttime attack on Medina, leaving half of their men at Dhu Husa as a reserve. The attacking cavalry reached the mountain passes during the night, where fighters were already positioned. Scouts on foot preceded them, alerting the defenders and sending a message to Caliph Abu Bakr.

Abu Bakr ordered them to hold their positions, which they did, while the caliph led the inhabitants from the mosque, mounted on their pack camels. (Note: These camels were used for transporting goods, and according to Muhammad ibn Jarir al-Tabari, these camels were specifically used for carrying water.) Faced with this response, the apostates lost their resolve and turned back.

===== According to Tamir Abu Suood Muhammad =====
In his work Biographies of the Rightly Guided Caliphs, Tamir Abu Suood Muhammad relates that after three days, the apostate rebels began to move actively within the Dhu Husa camp. Muslim scouts reported that the apostates were planning to attack Medina that night. Caliph Abu Bakr gathered all the adult Muslim men in the mosque. After the Isha prayer, these men were divided into groups to guard the various neighborhoods of the city. Leading a contingent, Abu Bakr took position at a strategic point facing Dhu Husa, where the attack was expected to occur.

The apostates launched the attack at midnight, hoping to take the city by surprise. Convinced that there was no fighting force in Medina, they expected to meet no resistance and anticipated an easy victory. As the apostate forces advanced in the darkness of the night, Abu Bakr's contingent fell upon them, taking them by surprise. Many apostate rebels were killed in the battle, while the others fled in total confusion back to Dhu Husa, where the Muslims pursued them.

==== Second confrontation ====
===== According to Agha Ali Ibrahim Akram =====
The day after this first victorious confrontation for the Rashidun Caliphate, Abu Bakr left Medina accompanied by a large number of pack camels, (Note: Used for transporting goods.) as all the riding camels (Note: Used for transporting people.) had been requisitioned for the Expedition of Usama bin Zayd. Upon their arrival at the abandoned camp of the apostates, the Muslims who had expelled them mounted the camels, and the army headed towards Dhu Husa, the apostates' base camp.

Hibal ibn Khuwailid, anticipating the Muslims' approach, displayed his military skills by strategically positioning his troops behind a slope, at some distance from the base towards which the Muslims were advancing. The Muslims, riding their pack camels, advanced unsuspectingly, unaware of the apostates' presence hidden behind the slope. As they approached the summit, the apostates suddenly emerged and hurled numerous water-filled goatskins towards the Muslims. Loud noises echoed among the apostates, with some drumming and shouting. The pack camels, untrained for battle and unaccustomed to sudden noises or unfamiliar objects, panicked and fled. Despite the Muslims' efforts to control their mounts, they failed and soon, the entire Muslim force retreated towards Medina.

Hibal ibn Khuwailid, having repelled the Muslims without truly engaging in battle, interpreted their retreat as a sign of fear, not realizing that the camels' panic was the real cause. The part of his forces remaining at Dhu al-Qassah was informed of this success and prepared to advance. That same evening, the entirety of the apostate forces advanced and re-established their camp near Medina, which they had left the previous day. The morale of the apostates was strengthened by this success.

===== According to Muhammad ibn Jarir al-Tabari =====
The Muslims pursued the apostate cavalry on their pack camels to Dhu Husa, where the enemy reserves suddenly appeared with inflated goatskins, tied with ropes. They then rolled them with their feet towards the camels, each skin unwinding on its tether. The Muslims' pack camels, panicking as never before. despite the Muslims' efforts to control their mounts, failed and brought them back to Medina. However, no Muslim was thrown off or injured.

The apostates, believing that the Muslims were in a weakened position, sent instructions to the troops at Dhu al-Qassah, urging them to advance. In response to this situation, Abu Bakr spent the night reorganizing and preparing his army.

==== Third confrontation ====
===== According to Agha Ali Ibrahim Akram =====
The Muslims, furious and determined to take revenge, learned that the apostates had returned to their camp near Medina and decided to attack them before they could finalize their battle preparations. Under the instructions of Abu Bakr, the Muslims spent most of the night reorganizing their small army and preparing for combat.

During the last part of the night, Abu Bakr led his army out of Medina and deployed it in an assault formation, with a center, two flanks, and a rear guard. He kept the center under his direct command, placed the right flank under al-Nu'man ibn Muqarrin, the left flank under Abd Allah ibn Muqarrin, and the rear guard under Suwayd ibn Muqarrin. Before dawn, the army advanced towards the enemy camp, where the apostates, confident of an easy victory the next day, were sound asleep. This time, it was Hibal ibn Khuwailid who was caught by surprise.

Before the first light of dawn appeared, the Muslims launched a furious assault on the apostates' camp. Without quarter, they killed many enemies. while most of the survivors fled, stopping only at Dhu al-Qassah to rest and regroup.

After this attack, the morale of the apostates was significantly weakened. Abu Bakr had opted for a surprise attack to compensate for his numerical inferiority, and this strategy proved successful.

===== According to Muhammad ibn Jarir al-Tabari =====
After spending most of the night reorganizing and preparing his army, Abu Bakr marched out in battle order during the last part of the night, with Al-Nu'man ibn Muqrin on his right flank, Abdullah ibn Muqrin on his left flank, and Suwaid ibn Muqrin commanding the cavalry at the rear.

At dawn, they found themselves on the same plain as the apostates. The Muslims advanced in silence, without making a sound, until they attacked the apostates with their swords, massacring them before the night was over. Thus, before the first ray of sunlight rose, the Muslims had already turned their backs on the enemy, and Hibal ibn Khuwailid was killed. The Muslims seized all their riding camels (Note: Or saddle camels, used for transporting people.) after the confrontation.

==== Fourth confrontation ====
===== According to Agha Ali Ibrahim Akram =====
After winning this battle, Caliph Abu Bakr decided to give his enemies no respite. At sunrise, he led his troops towards Dhu al-Qassah. Upon arrival, he reorganized his combat unit in the same manner as the previous night and launched a new attack. The apostates, with weakened morale, offered initial resistance before retreating towards Abraq, where other members of the Banu Ghatafan, Banu Hawāzin, and Tayy clans had gathered.

After capturing Dhu al-Qassah, Abu Bakr sent a small force under the command of Talha ibn Ubayd Allah to pursue the enemy. Talha ibn Ubayd Allah advanced a short distance and eliminated some stragglers, but the small size of his contingent limited his ability to inflict significant losses on the retreating apostates.

===== According to Muhammad ibn Jarir al-Tabari =====
Al-Tabari does not detail the events of the fourth confrontation as extensively as his counterpart Agha Ali Ibrahim Akram. However, he reports that Abu Bakr pursued the apostates until he camped at Dhu al-Qassah, the headquarters of the apostate rebels^{,}.

=== Post-battle ===
==== According to Agha Ali Ibrahim Akram ====
Dhu al-Qassah was occupied on July 30, 632. (Note: 8 Jumada al-Awwal in 11 AH) Abu Bakr left Al-Nu'man ibn Muqrin with a unit to occupy Dhu al-Qassah, while he returned to Medina with the rest of his army. On August 2, 632, the army of Usama bin Zayd returned to Medina, ending the threat to the capital of the Caliphate.

==== According to Muhammad ibn Jarir al-Tabari ====
Abu Bakr appointed Al-Nu'man ibn Muqrin to lead a portion of the troops at Dhu al-Qassah, then returned to Medina. According to Al-Tabari, the army of Usama bin Zayd returned between 40 and 60 days after its departure. Its departure was confirmed at the end of Rabi' al-Awwal, which in 632 CE corresponded to the end of June. Adding 40 to 60 days aligns with the accounts of Agha Ali Ibrahim Akram, who places the return of Usama bin Zayd's army on August 2, 632.

== Outcome and consequences ==
=== Outcome ===
The series of four confrontations during this battle is marked by strategic turnarounds and discrepancies in the accounts, although the outcomes of the confrontations are identical.

In summary: after an initial victory by the Rashidun Caliphate, a subsequent attempt fails due to a clever ruse by the apostates. However, Caliph Abu Bakr managed to lead a successful night attack. Building on this success, the fourth confrontation, led by Abu Bakr, results in the retreat of the apostate rebels from Dhu al-Qassah to the Abraq area.

=== Consequences ===
One of the consequences of the Battle of Dhu al-Qassah is that the apostate rebels, (Note: Muhammad ibn Jarir al-Tabari identifies the apostate rebels as the Banu Dhubyan and the Banu Abs. He also states that "their supporters did the same." Although no further information specifies the identity of these supporters, it is likely they were those who participated in the battle (cf. table in the "Background" section and page 76 in his work The History of al-Tabari Volume 10: The Conquest of Arabia). Agha Ali Ibrahim Akram, for his part, does not mention specific tribes.) in retaliation for their defeat, attacked the Muslims among them and massacred them. Abu Bakr vowed that in retaliation for each Muslim killed, he would eliminate an equivalent or even greater number of apostate rebels from each tribe^{,}.

Another major consequence of the battle is that it clarified the positions of the neutral tribes. Many tribes sent delegations to Medina, pledged allegiance to the authorities, and paid the Zakat, while the tribes opposed to Islam openly declared their apostasy. The situation was thus clearly defined.

Zakat began to arrive at Medina at night, brought successively by Safwan bin Safwan ibn Tamimi, then Al-Zabarqan Bin Badr, and finally Adi ibn Hatim. Safwan bin Safwan ibn Tamimi arrived at the beginning of the night, Al-Zabarqan Bin Badr in the middle of it, and Adi ibn Hatim at the end. At each arrival, people exclaimed:

He brings a warning about the enemy!

But Abu Bakr responded:

He is a bearer of good news, a protector, not someone exhausted by urgency.

After hearing the good news, they declared:

Long live the good news you bring!

This victory of Abu Bakr and his newly established caliphate holds significant symbolic importance on multiple levels: It was his first battle as caliph, which was also victorious; it marked the beginning of the Wars of Apostasy, solidified his position as caliph, and reinforced his legitimacy among the Muslims within the Rashidun Caliphate to continue the Wars of Apostasy.

== Sources ==
=== Bibliography ===
- Akram, Agha Ali Ibrahim (2009). Sword of Allah: Khalid Bin Al-waleed, His Life and Campaigns. Adam Publishers & Distributors. p. 504. ISBN 978-8174355218.
- Bamborough, Philip (1977). Treasures of Islam. New York: Arco Pub. Co. p. 164. ISBN 978-0668041782., ISBN 0668041781
- Hodgkin, E.C (1991). The Arabs. The Darwin Press, Inc. p. 164. ISBN 978-0668041782., ISBN 0668041781
- Jandora, John Walter (1991). The March from Medina: A Revisionist Study of the Arab Conquests. London Oxford University Press. p. 155. ISBN 978-0940670334., ISBN 094067033X
- Ouardi, Hela (2016). Les derniers jours de Muhammad (in French). Albin Michel. p. 365. ISBN 978-2226316448., ISBN 2226316442
- ibn Jarir al-Tabari, Muhammad (1993). The History of al-Tabari Vol. 10: The Conquest of Arabia: The Riddah Wars A.D. 632-633/A.H. State University of New York Press. p. 244. ISBN 978-0791410721., ISBN 0791410722
- Abu Suood Muhammad, Tamir (2020). Biographies of the Rightly Guided Caliphs: Prepared from the Works of ibn Katheer, At Tabari, As Suyuti and Other Historians. p. 416. ISBN 978-1675004272., ISBN 1675004277

=== External links ===
- Parizi, Ebrahim Khorasani (2011). Ansar's Role in the Suppression of Apostates in the Era of Caliphate of Abu Bakr (PDF). Iran: Department of History, Faculty of Literature and Humanities, Baft Branch, Islamic Azad University, Baft. p. 10. ISSN 2090-4304. Archived from the original (PDF) on 2024-05-22.
- Publisher, Supremeseerah (2023). Biography of Khalifa Abu Bakr Siddiq (PDF). p. 180.
- Kennedy, Hugh (2008). The Great Arab Conquests: How the Spread of Islam Changed the World We Live In. Da Capo Press. p. 421. ISBN 978-0306817403., ISBN 0306817403

=== Internal Links ===
- List of battles of the Rashidun Caliphate

=== Videography ===
- Omar Al-Farouq [عُمَرْ] (in French). MBC Group & Qatar TV. 2012. MBC1.
