= Bathi, Saudi Arabia =

Bathi بطحي
- Village
- Location in Saudi Arabia
- Coordinates: 25°01′40.00″N 41°54′41.61″E
- Country: Saudi Arabia
- Province: Al Madinah Province, Al-Hunakiyah
- Time zone: UTC+3 (EAT)
  - Summer (DST): UTC+3 (EAT)

Bathi (Arabic: بطحي) is a village in the Al-Hunakiyah Governorate, located in the Medina Region of Saudi Arabia.

== Geography ==
The village lies to the east of Madinah. About 30 kilometers to its west is the Bulghah Gold Mine.

== Services ==
Bathi is part of the rural landscape of Al-Hunakiyah Governorate and is administratively affiliated with it. The village is characterized by its agricultural and pastoral activities.

== See also ==
- Medina
- Al-Hunakiyah
- List of governorates of Saudi Arabia
- List of cities and towns in Saudi Arabia
- Regions of Saudi Arabia
