= Conquest of Seville (712) =

- Part of Umayyad conquest of Hispania
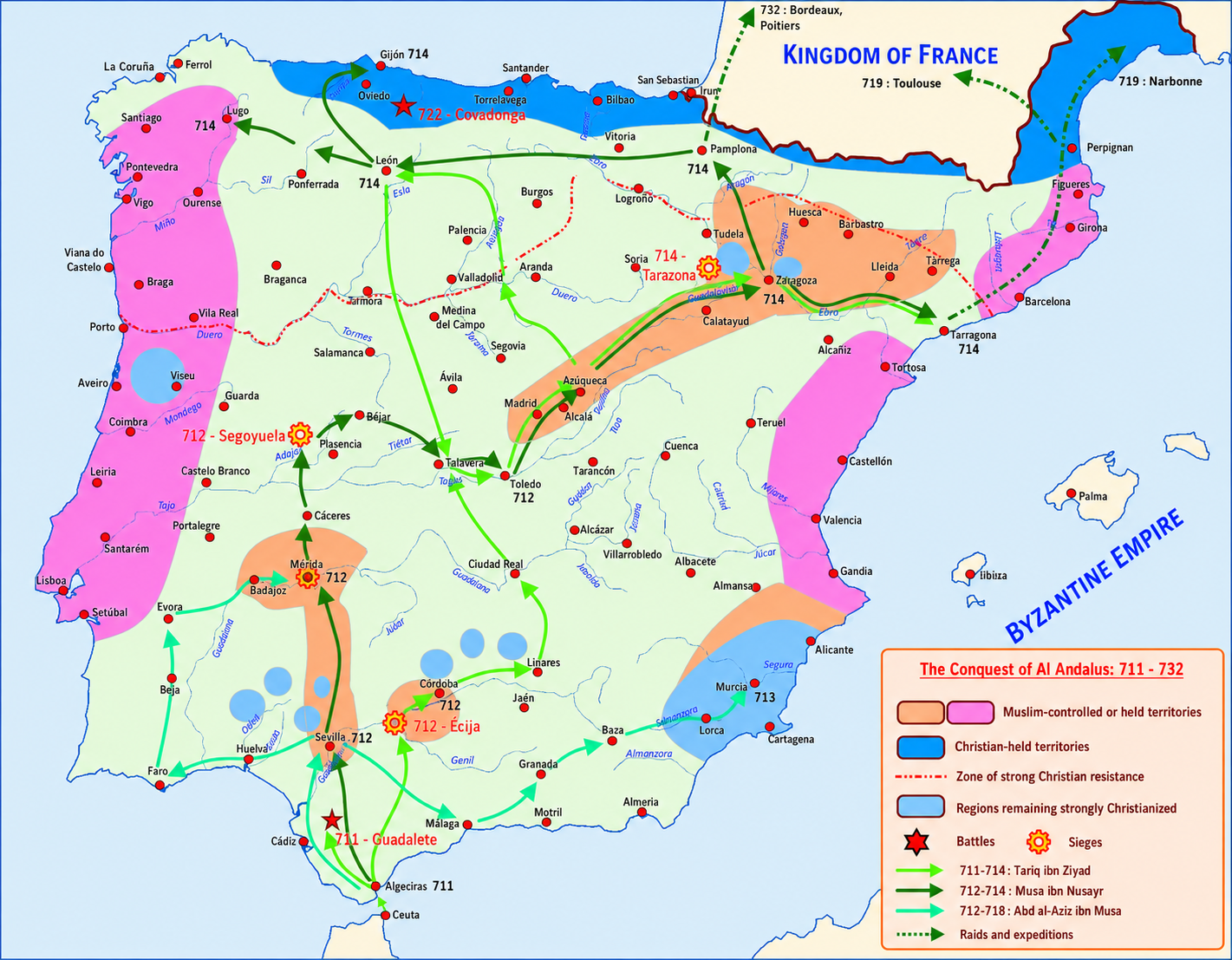
- Musa's march into Spain
Date	August–September/October 712
Location	Seville, Spain
Result	Umayyad victory

Belligerents
Visigothic Kingdom	Umayyad Caliphate

Commanders and leaders
Unknown	Musa ibn Nusayr

Strength
Unknown	Unknown

Casualties and losses
Heavy	Unknown

The Conquest of Seville was a successful capture of the city by Umayyad forces led by Musa ibn Nusayr from the Visigothic Kingdom.

== Background ==
With the coming of Germanic people into Hispania in the early 5th century, it was occupied by the Vandals, who took Seville as their capital. But as the Vandals moved to North Africa, the Visigoths took over and made Toledo their capital. Seville lost its political and military power but remained a large and wealthy city with fine monuments and buildings. It was also a religious center in Spain. Seville was situated on the left bank of the Guadalquivir River. It was also a well-fortified city where only from the east could be attacked. The west of it is protected by a river.

== Conquest ==
After the conquest of Carmona, Musa moved with his army to Seville and arrived there in August 712 and began laying siege to it. It's difficult to assess how long the siege has lasted; some historians mention that it took several months, but most likely it took one or two months due to the view of chronological events. Details regarding the siege are few, but Musa successfully assaulted the city by force, which made the Visigothic garrison flee to Beja. The remainder of the population accepted the Muslim rule. After the conquest, Musa quickly began establishing his hold on the city; he placed the local Jews in charge of administering the city and left a force of 100 men to establish law and order.

After his victory, Musa marched to capture Mérida.

== Sources ==
- Agha Ibrahim Akram (2004), The Muslim Conquest of Spain.
- David James (2012), A History of Early Al-Andalus, The Akhbar Majmu'a.
- Abdulwahid Dhanun Taha (2016), Routledge Library Editions: Muslim Spain.
