= Abraq =

Abraq may refer to:

== Places ==
- Abraq Khaytan, village in Kuwait
- Al Abraq, Libya, town in Derna District
- Al Abraq, Yemen, village in San‘a’ Governorate

== Battles ==
- Battle of Abraq, battle between the Rashidun Caliphate and Arab rebels
