= Nahavand Castle =

- قلعه نهاوند (Persian)
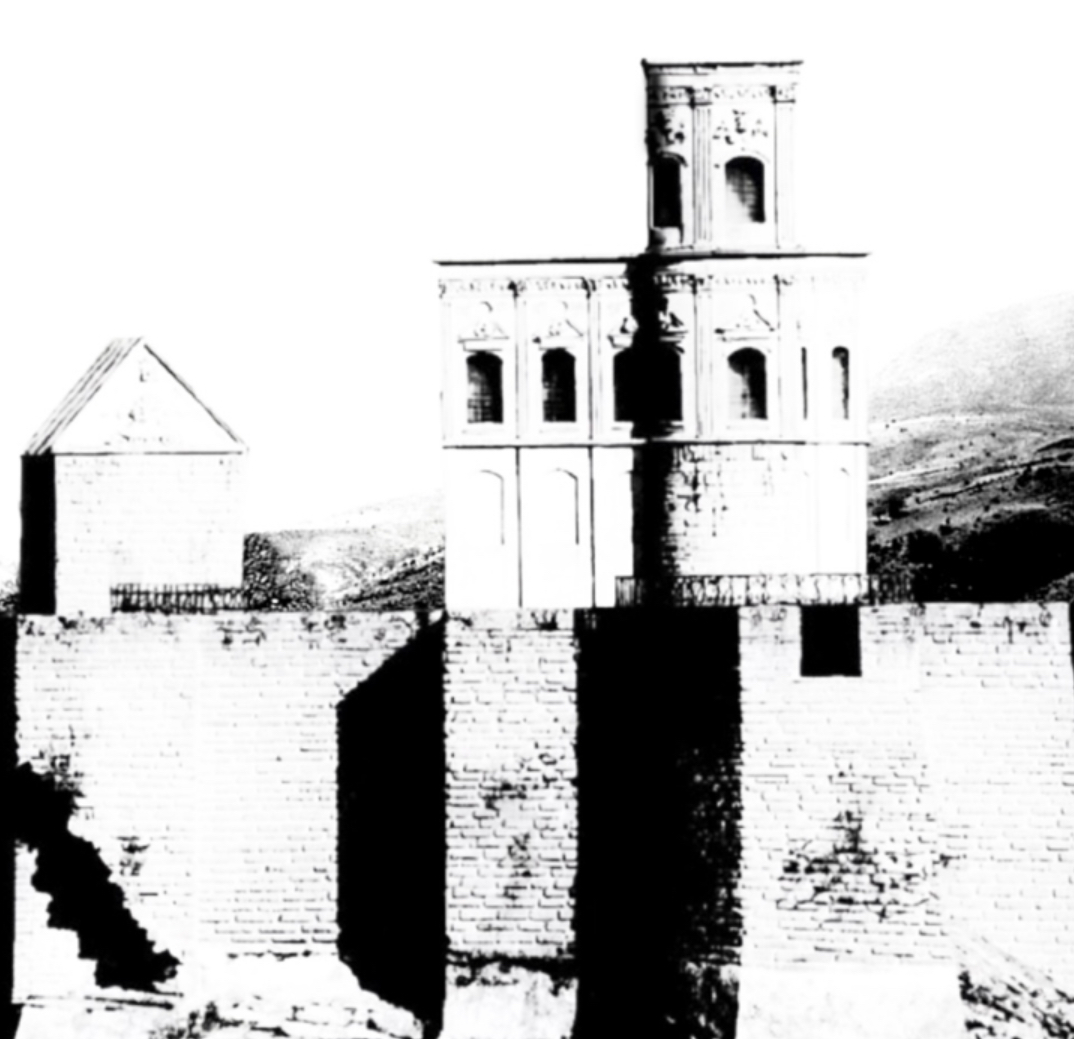
- Nahavand Castle and the Qajar era mansion of Emamqoli Mirza Emad-al-Dawla situated on top.

History
- Built: Sasanian era
- Demolished: Qajar era

Nahāvand Castle (Persian: قلعه نهاوند) was an ancient castle from the Sasanian era that was located in what is now the city of Nahavand in Hamedan province, Iran. The fall of this castle in the Battle of Nahavand was a major turning point in the Islamic conquest of Persia.

Nonetheless, the castle survived up until the time of Naser al-Din Shah Qajar. It was said that when digging a qanat, Naser al-Din Shah found a treasure. He then ordered the castle to be destroyed in order to find more treasures; however, no more were found.

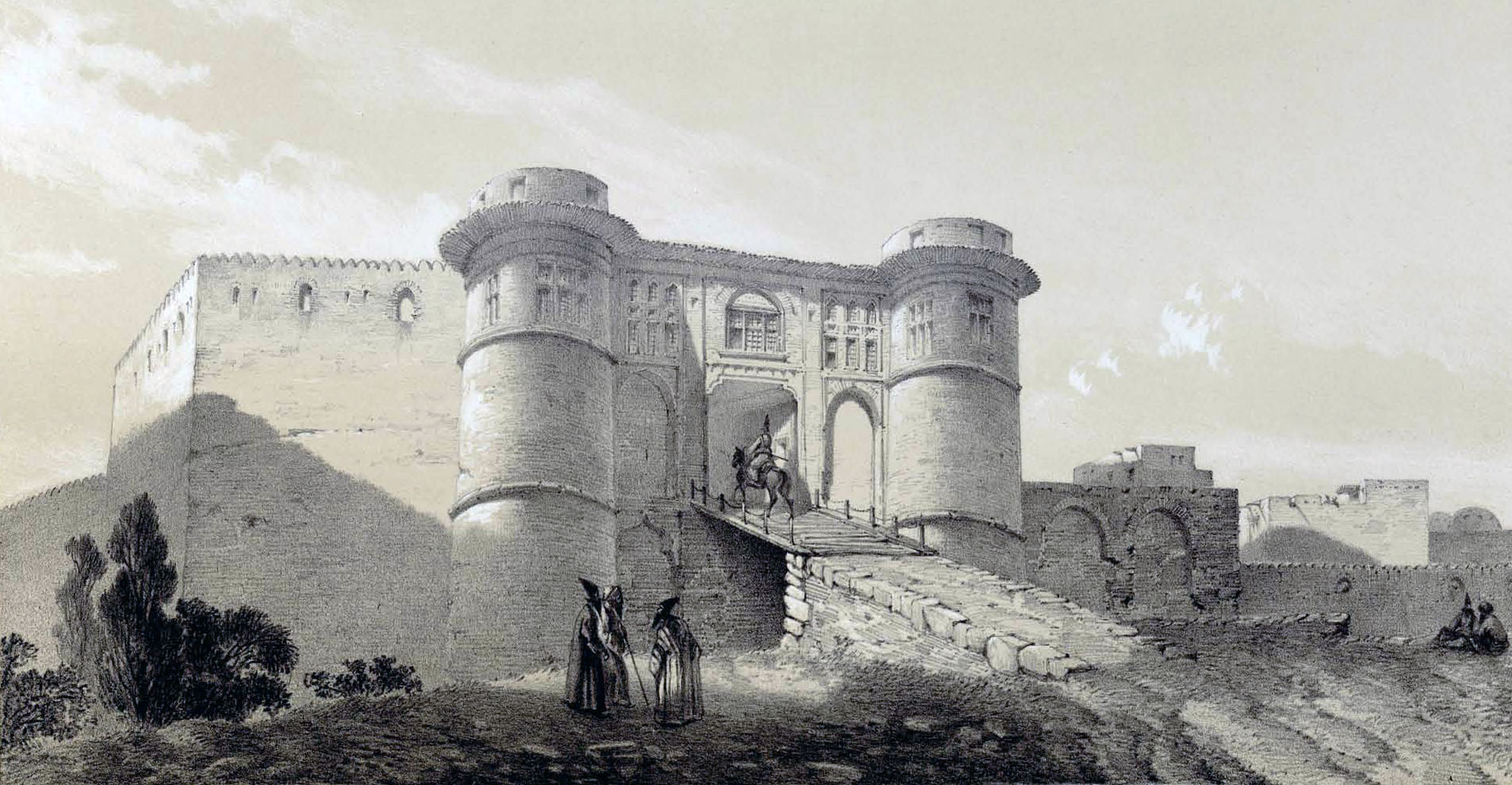
The castle in 1840, in the time of Mohammad Shah Qajar, in a painting by Eugène Flandin and Pascal Coste
