= Institute of Regional Studies =

Pakistani think tank

- ادارہِ علاقائی تحقیق اسلام آباد ، پاکستان
- Formation: November 1981; 44 years ago
- Type: Think tank
- Headquarters: Ataturk Avenue, Sector F-5/2, Islamabad, Pakistan
- Region served: South Asia
- Website: www.irs.org.pk

The Institute of Regional Studies (ادارہِ علاقائی تحقیق اسلام آباد ، پاکستان) is a non-profit research centre devoted to the study of the region around Pakistan: South Asia, Southwest Asia (Iran, Afghanistan and the Persian Gulf), China, and central Asia, as well as the Indian Ocean region. It also studies and analyses policies of major power centers towards South Asia. The institute was set up in November 1981, It is considered one of Pakistan's leading think tanks.
