= Battle of Muzayyah =

Battle between Caliphate and Sassanids in 633

- Part of Islamic conquest of Persia and Campaigns of Khalid ibn al-Walid
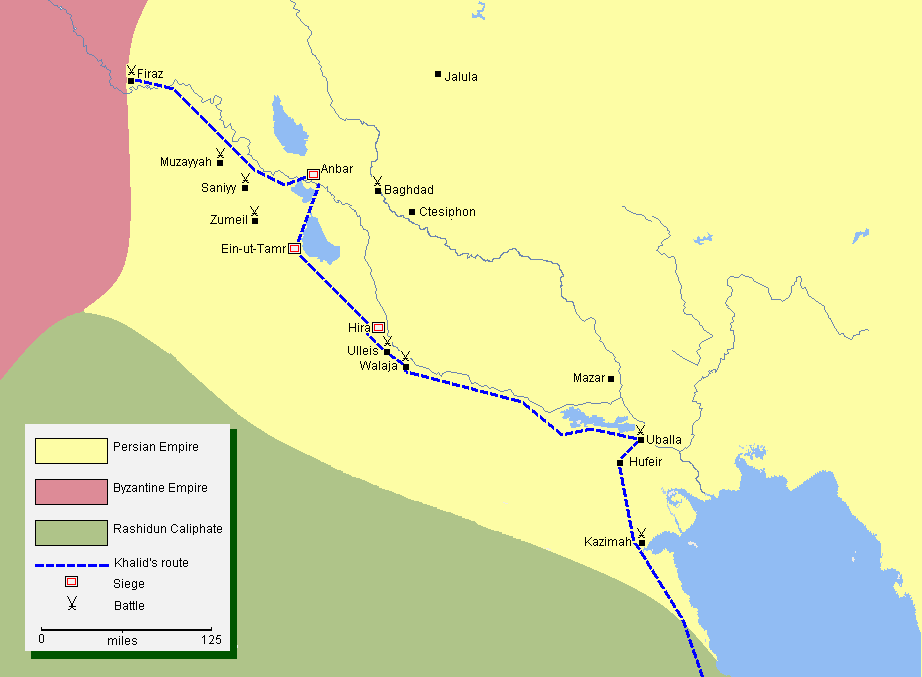
Date	November 633
Location	Iraq
Result	Muslim victory

Belligerents
Rashidun Caliphate	Sasanian Empire, Arab Christians

Commanders and leaders
Khalid ibn al-Walid	Bahman Jadhuyih, Mahbuzan, Huzail ibn Imran

Strength
15,000	15,000–20,000

Casualties and losses
Minimal	10,000+

Battle of Muzayyah (Arabic: معركة المصيخ) was between the Muslim Arab army and the Sasanian Empire. When Khalid ibn Walid left from Ayn al-Tamr to Dumat Al-Jandal for the help of Iyad ibn Ghanm, the Persian court believed that Khalid had returned to Arabia with a large part of his army. The Persians decided to throw the Muslims back into the desert and regain the territories and the prestige which the Persian Empire had lost. The Persians had resolved not to fight Khalid again, but they were quite prepared to fight the Muslims without Khalid ibn al-Walid.

== Background ==
By now, Bahman had organised a new army, made up partly of the survivors of the Battle of Ullais, partly of veterans drawn from garrisons in other parts of the Empire, and partly of fresh recruits. This army was now ready for battle. With its numerous raw recruits, however, it was not of the same quality as the armies which had fought Muslims south of the Euphrates. Bahman decided not to commit this army to battle until its strength had been augmented by the large forces of Christian Arabs who remained loyal to the Empire. He therefore initiated parleys with the Arabs. The Christian Arabs responded willingly and eagerly to the overtures of the Persian court. Apart from the defeat at the Battle of Ayn al-Tamr, the incensed Arabs of this area also sought revenge for the killing of their great chief, Aqqa ibn Qays ibn Bashir. They were anxious, too, to regain the lands which they had lost to the Muslims, and to free the comrades who had been captured by the invaders. A large number of clans began to prepare for war. Bahman divided the Persian forces into two field armies and sent them off from Ctesiphon. One, under Ruzbeh, moved to Husaid, and the other, under Zarmahr, moved to Khanafis. For the moment these two armies were located in separate areas for ease of movement and administration, but they were not to proceed beyond these locations until the Christian Arabs were ready for battle. Bahman planned to concentrate the entire imperial army to either await a Muslim attack or march south to fight the Muslims at Hira.

But the Christian Arabs were not yet ready. They were forming into two groups: the first, under a chief named Huzail bin Imran, was concentrating at Muzayyah; the second, under the chief Rabi'a bin Bujair, was gathering at two places close to each other-Saniyy and Zumail. These two groups, when ready, would join the Persians and form one large, powerful army. This was the situation that greeted Khalid on his arrival at Hira from Dumat Al-Jandal in the fourth week of September 633. The situation could assume dangerous proportions, but only if the four imperial forces succeeded in uniting and took offensive action against Hira.

Khalid decided to fight and destroy each imperial force separately. With this strategy in mind, he divided the Muslim garrison of Hira into two corps, one of which he placed under Al-Qa'qa'a ibn Amr at-Tamimi and the other under Abu Laila. Khalid sent them both to Ayn al-Tamr, where he would join them a little later, after the troops who had fought at Dumat Al-Jandal had been rested.

A few days later the entire Muslim army was concentrated at Ayn al-Tamr, except for a small garrison left under Iyad ibn Ghanm to look after Hira. The army was now organised in three corps of about 5,000 men each, one of which was kept in reserve. Khalid sent Al-Qa'qa'a ibn Amr at-Tamimi to Husaid and Abu Laila to Khanafis with orders to destroy the Persian armies at those places. It was Khalid's intention to fight both Persian armies speedily as well as simultaneously, so that neither could get away while the other was being slashed to pieces. But this was not to be; for the march to Khanafis was longer than to Husaid, and Abu Laila failed to move his forces with sufficient speed to make up for this difference. Meanwhile, Khalid remained with his reserve corps at Ayn al-Tamr to guard against any offensive movement from Saniyy and Zumail towards Hira. Qaqa defeated the Persian army at Husaid, and the remaining army retreated to Khanafis. Thus the commander of the army at Khanafis heard about the Muslims' victory at Husaid; he withdrew his forces to Muzayyah and joined the Christian Arabs.

== Manoeuvre of Khalid ==
The remaining objectives were Muzayyah, Saniyy and Zumail. Khalid ibn al-Walid selected Muzayyah; the others were smaller objectives which could be dealt with later without difficulty. By now the exact location of the imperial camp at Muzayyah had been established by Khalid's agents. To deal with this objective he designed a manoeuvre which, seldom practised in history, is one of the most difficult to control and co-ordinate-a simultaneous converging attack from three directions made at night.

== Attack ==
Khalid ibn al-Walid issued orders for the move. The three corps would march from their respective locations at Husaid, Khanafis and Ain-ut-Tamr along separate routes he had specified and meet on a given night and at a given hour at a place a few miles short of Muzayyah. This move was carried out as planned, and the three corps concentrated at the appointed place. He laid down the time of the attack and the three separate directions from which the three corps would fall upon the unsuspecting enemy. The imperial army knew of the attack only when three roaring masses of Muslim warriors hurled themselves at the camp. In the confusion of the night the imperial army never found its feet. Terror became the mood of the camp as soldiers fleeing from one Muslim corps ran into another. Thousands were slaughtered. The Muslims tried to finish this army, but large numbers of Persians and Arabs nevertheless managed to get away, helped by the very darkness that had cloaked the surprise attack.

== Aftermath ==
After the battle of Muzayyah, the surviving Christian Arabs and Persian soldiers joined the Arab army at Saniyya. They were destroyed later in the battle of Saniyy and the battle of Zumail.

== On-line resources ==
- A.I. Akram, The Sword of Allah: Khalid bin al-Waleed, His Life and Campaigns Lahore, 1969
