= Battle of Zumail =

Caliphate's battle in 633

- Part of Campaigns of Khalid ibn al-Walid
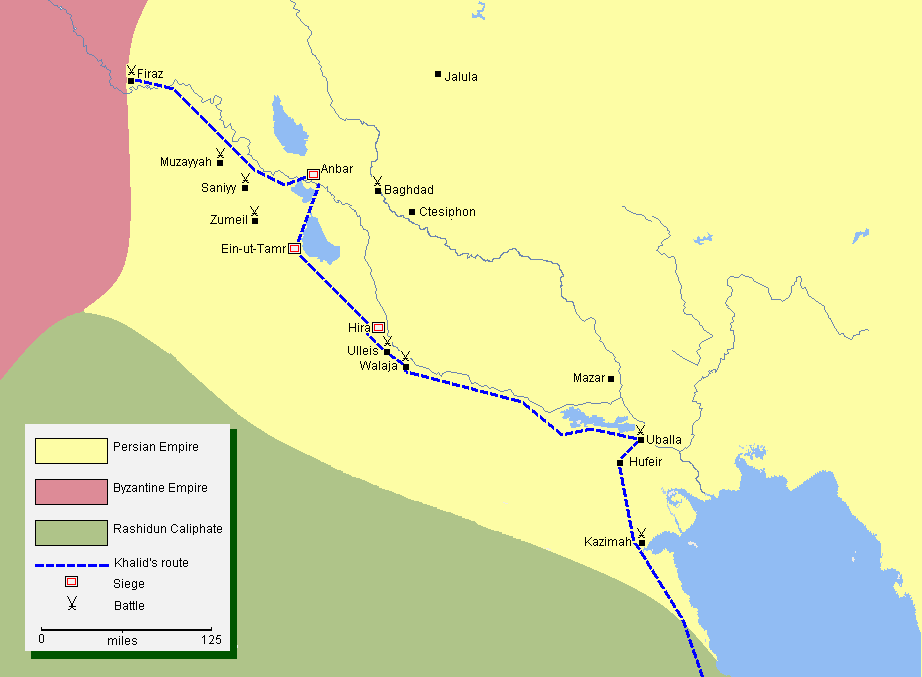
Date	November 633 CE
Location	Sasanian Mesopotamia
Result	Muslim victory

Belligerents
Muslim Arabs	Arab Christians

Commanders and leaders
Khalid ibn al-Walid; Iyad ibn Ghanm; Al-Qa'qa'a ibn Amr at-Tamimi	Rabi'a ibn Bujair

Strength
15,000	5,000–10,000

Casualties and losses
Minimal	5,000+

The battle of Zumail (Arabic: معركة الزميل) was fought in 633 CE in Mesopotamia. It was a major Muslim victory in their conquest of that area. Under cover of night the Arab Muslims attacked the Christian-Arab forces, loyal to the Sasanian Empire, from three different sides. The Christian-Arab forces were unable to withstand the Muslim's surprise attack and soon dispersed but failed to escape from the battlefield and became the victims of a three-sided attack by Khalid ibn al-Walid's army. At Zumail nearly the whole Christian Arab army was slaughtered by Khalid's Corps.

== Background ==
When Khalid ibn Walid left from Ayn al-Tamr to Dumat Al-Jandal for the help of Iyad ibn Ghanm, the Persian court believed that Khalid had returned to Arabia with a large part of his army. The Persians decided to throw the Muslims back into the desert and regain the territories and the prestige which the Empire had lost. The Persians had resolved not to fight Khalid again, but they were quite prepared to fight the Muslims without Khalid ibn al-Walid. Khalid ibn al-Walid first defeated them at the battle of Muzayyah and then advanced towards Saniyy and defeated the Arab army there and finally defeated the last army at Zumail.

By now Bahman had organised a new army, made up partly of the survivors of the Battle of Ullais, partly of veterans drawn from garrisons in other parts of the Empire, and partly of fresh recruits. This army was now ready for battle. With its numerous raw recruits, however, it was not of the same quality as the armies which had fought Muslims south of the Euphrates. Bahman decided not to commit this army to battle until its strength had been augmented by the large forces of Christian Arabs who remained loyal to the Empire. He therefore initiated parleys with the Arabs.

The Christian Arabs responded willingly and eagerly to the overtures of the Persian court. Apart from the defeat at Ain-ul-Tamr, the incensed Arabs of this area also sought revenge for the killing of their great chief, Aqqa. They were anxious, too, to regain the lands which they had lost to the Muslims, and to free the comrades who had been captured by the invaders. A large number of clans began to prepare for war. Bahman divided the Persian forces into two field armies and sent them off from Ctesiphon. One, under Ruzbeh, moved to Husaid, and the other, under Zarmahr, moved to Khanafis. For the moment these two armies were located in separate areas for ease of movement and administration, but they were not to proceed beyond these locations until the Christian Arabs were ready for battle. Bahman planned to concentrate the entire imperial army to either await a Muslim attack or march south to fight the Muslims at Hira.

But the Christian Arabs were not yet ready. They were forming into two groups: the first, under a chief named Huzail bin Imran, was concentrating at Muzayyah; the second, under the chief Rabi'a bin Bujair, was gathering at two places close to each other-Saniyy and Zumail. These two groups, when ready, would join the Persians and form one large, powerful army.

This was the situation that greeted Khalid on his arrival at Hira from Dumat Al-Jandal in the fourth week of September 633. The situation could assume dangerous proportions, but only if the four imperial forces succeeded in uniting and took offensive action against Hira. Khalid decided to fight and destroy each imperial force separately. With this strategy in mind, he divided the Muslim garrison of Hira into two corps, one of which he placed under Qaqa and the other under Abu Laila. Khalid sent them both to Ain-ul-Tamr, where he would join them a little later, after the troops who had fought at Dumat Al-Jandal had been rested.

A few days later, the entire Muslim army was concentrated at Ayn al-Tamr, except for a small garrison left under Iyad ibn Ghanm to look after Hira. The army was now organised in three corps of about 5,000 men each, one of which was kept in reserve. Khalid sent Al-Qa'qa'a ibn Amr at-Tamimi to Husaid and Abu Laila to Khanafis with orders to destroy the Persian armies at those places. It was Khalid's intention to fight both Persian armies speedily as well as simultaneously, so that neither could get away while the other was being slashed to pieces. But this was not to be; for the march to Khanafis was longer than to Husaid, and Abu Laila failed to move his forces with sufficient speed to make up for this difference. Meanwhile, Khalid remained with his reserve corps at Ain-ut-Tamr to guard against any offensive movement from Saniyy and Zumail towards Hira. Qaqa defeated the Persian army at Husaid, the remaining army retreated to Khanafis, where when the commander of the army at Khanafis heard about the Muslims' victory at Husaid, he withdrew his forces to Muzayyah and joined the Christian Arabs. At Muzayyah, that army was defeated in the Battle of Muzayyah later the same was done to the army at Saniyy.

== Manoeuvre of Khalid ==
The remaining objectives were Muzayyah, the Saniyy, and Zumail. Khalid ibn al-Walid selected Muzayyah. The other was a smaller objective and could be dealt with later without difficulty as by now the exact location of the imperial camps at Muzayyah, Saniyy, and Zumail had been established by Khalid's agents, and to deal with this objective he designed a manoeuvre which, seldom practised in history, is one of the most difficult to control and co-ordinate-a simultaneous converging attack from three directions made at night.

== Battle ==
After two or three nights of the battle of Saniyy, Khalid's Three Corps reached Zumail at night and attacked the Christian Arab forces from three different sides as planned before. The Christian Arab forces were unable to withstand the Muslim's surprise attack and soon dispersed but failed to escape from the battlefield and became the victims of a three-sided attack by Khalid ibn al-Walid's army. At Zumail, nearly the whole Christian Arab army was slaughtered by Khalid's Corps.

== Aftermath ==
These battles ended Persian control in Mesopotamia, which finally fell to the Islamic Caliphate.
