= Al-Nu'man ibn Muqarrin =

Sahabah

An-Numan ibn Muqarrin (Arabic: النعمان بن مقرن; died December 641) was a companion of the Islamic prophet Muhammad. He was the leader of the tribe of Banu Muzaina.

He converted to Islam after the Battle of Uhud, and was involved in the Ahzab War. He carried the banner of Muzainah during conquest of Mecca. During the caliphate of Abu Bakr (r. 632–634), An-Numan and his family played a major role in putting an end to the apostasy wars like in the Battle of Dhu al-Qassah. They fought under Khalid bin Waleed in the wars in Iraq, and later An-Numan fought under Sad Ibn Abi Waqqas.

== Battle of Nahavand ==
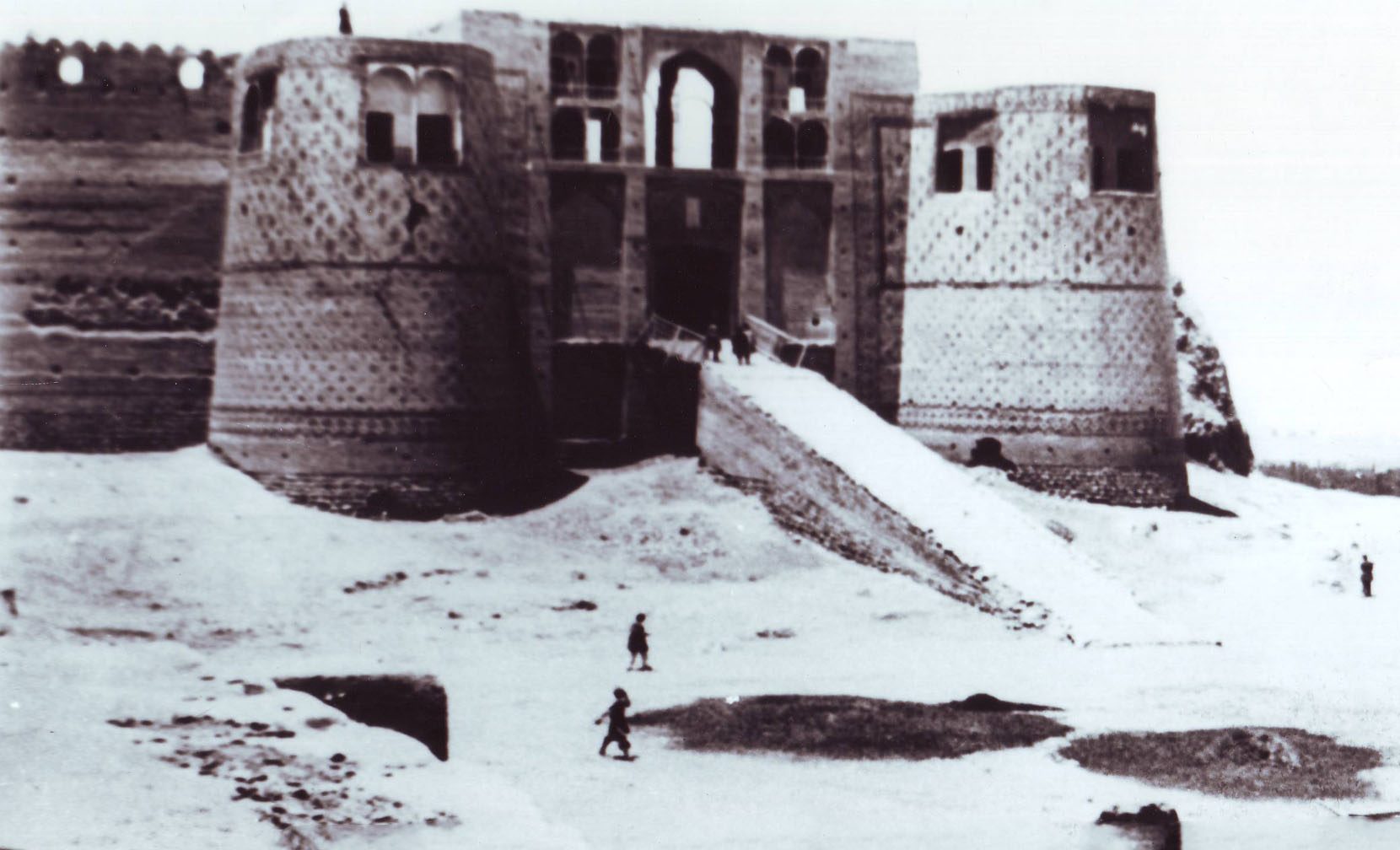
Nahavand Castle

After the battle of Kaskar, Numan was appointed the administrator of the Kaskar district. An-Numan was unhappy with the civil appointment and wrote to the caliph Umar ibn al-Khattab (r. 634–644) requesting active service. In the campaign against the Persians concentrated at Nihawand, Umar appointed An-Numan as the commander of the Muslim army. Before the battle of Nahavand broke out, Nu'man prayed, "O Allah, grant Nu'man martyrdom with the victory of the Muslims." His prayer was answered where he was martyred first and then the Muslim army won the battle.

At Nahāvand, an estimated 30,000 Arab warriors under the command of Nuʿmān attacked a Sāsānian army reportedly of ca. 100,000 men. According to the history writer Peter Crawford, the forces that gathered there was variously recorded as anything from 50,000 to 100,000. Mostly farmers and villagers, not veteran soldiers. After heavy casualties were incurred on both sides, the Persians were defeated.

== Death ==
He was killed during the second phase of the Battle of Nihawānd on the third week of December 641 CE or 21 AH. Hearing of his death, Umar covered his face with his hands while crying.

== See also ==
- Sunni view of the Sahaba
