= Battle of Nahavand =

Part of the Muslim conquest of Persia (642 CE)

- Part of the Muslim conquest of Persia
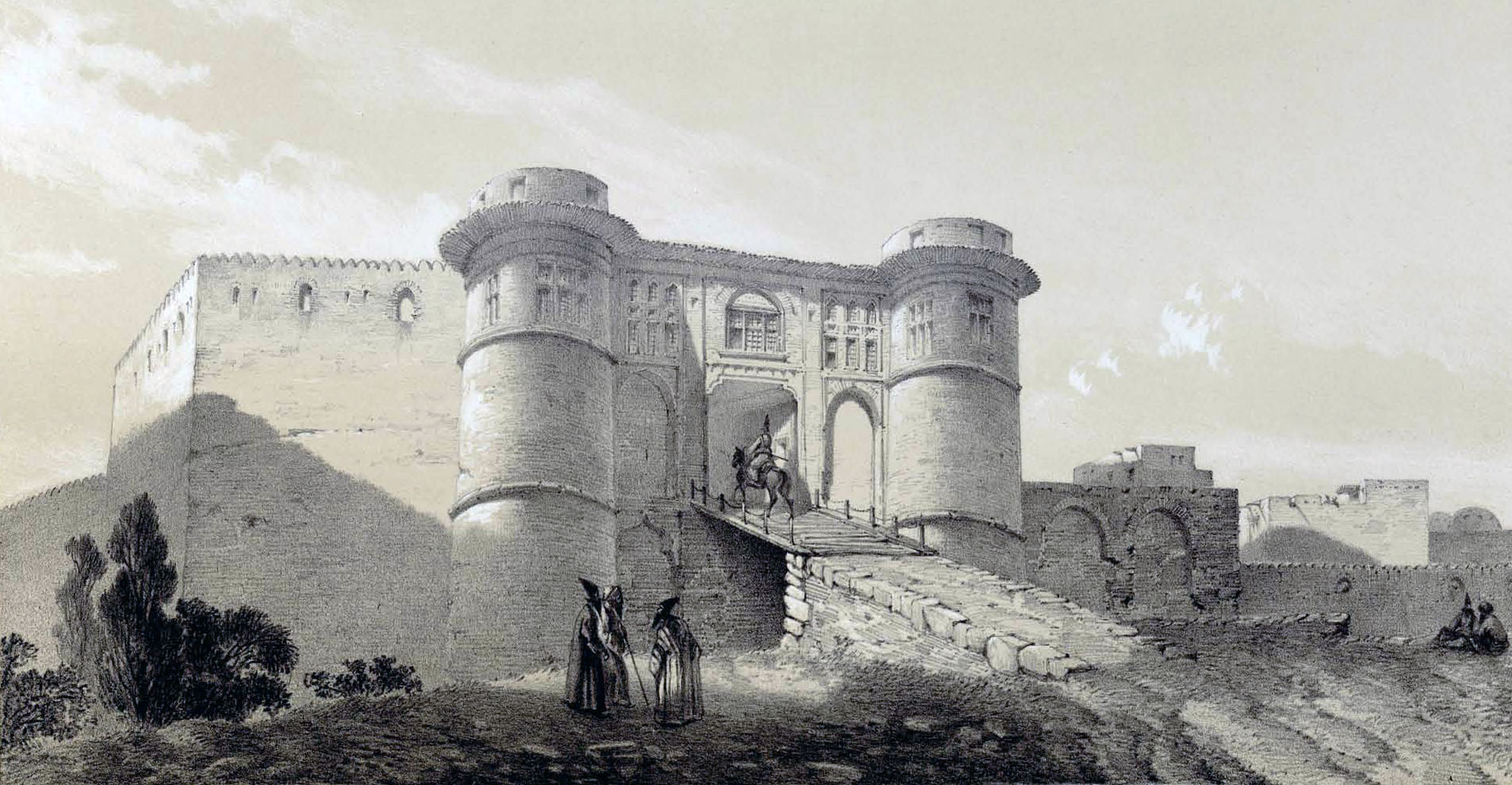
- Painting of the Nahavand Castle, which was one of the last Sasanian strongholds.
| Date | 642 |
| Location | Nahāvand, near Hamadan |
| Result | Rashidun victory |

Belligerents
| Rashidun Caliphate | Sasanian Empire |

Commanders and leaders
| An-Numan ibn Muqarrin † | Piruz Khosrow † |

Strength
| 30,000 | 50,000–150,000 |

Casualties and losses
| Heavy | Heavy |

The Battle of Nahavand (Arabic: معركة نهاوند Maʿrakah Nahāwand, Persian: نبرد نهاوند Nabard-e Nahâvand), also spelled Nihavand or Nahawand, was fought in 642 between the Rashidun Muslim forces under An-Numan ibn Muqarrin and Sasanian army under King Yazdegerd III. Yazdegerd escaped to the Merv area, but was unable to raise another substantial army. The battle ended in a victory for the Rashidun Caliphate and the Sasanids consequently lost the surrounding cities including Spahan (Isfahan). The engagement resulted in a catastrophic defeat for the Sasanid forces and marks the end of organized Sasanid resistance. This opened the path for Islamic expansion into Persia and the subsequent religious transformation of the region.

The former Sasanid provinces, in alliance with Parthian and White Hun nobles, resisted for about a century in Tabaristan, the region south of the Caspian Sea, even as the Rashidun Caliphate was replaced by the Umayyads, thus perpetuating the Sasanid court styles, Zoroastrian religion, and Persian language.

== Background ==
At the time of the death of the Islamic Prophet Muhammad in 632, the religion that he led dominated the Hejaz (western Arabia). Under the first two caliphs Abu Bakr and Umar, Islam expanded into Palestine and Mesopotamia where it respectively confronted the East Roman and Persian (Sāsānian) empires. Both were exhausted by warfare and internal dissent. With the East Roman defeat at the Battle of Yarmouk (636), the Muslim Arabs were free to turn east to the Euphrates and the Persian heartland. In November 636 a Sāsānian army was defeated at the Battle of Qadisiya, resulting in the loss of Iraq to the Muslims.

== Number of Arabs and Sasanian forces ==
Following his defeat by the Arabs in 639, Yazdgerd III was forced to abandon his capital at Ctesiphon. From Mesopotamia, he withdrew into the Sāsānian homeland in what is now the southern plateau of Iran. By 642, he was able to assemble an army to replace the one lost at Qadisiya.

At Nahāvand, Nu'man had an estimated 30,000 Arab warriors under his command. The Sāsānian army numbered around 50,000-150,000 men, (Note: "While such large numbers are usually cause for concern and the forces available to the Persians will have been drastically reduced by the wars of the seventh century..[..]...it is entirely possible he was able to bring together a vast host from across all Persian society - soldiers, clergy, farmers, artisans, and peasantry.) consisting of mostly farmers and villagers, not veteran soldiers.

== Battle ==
Various accounts are told about Nahāvand and the early stages of the battle. According to some versions the Persian cavalry mounted an ill-prepared pursuit of the Arabs who retreated to a more secure location. The Arabs then rallied, before surrounding and trapping the Persian force. Finally the Muslim warriors assaulted the Sāsānian host from all sides and defeated it.

According to a different version, the Arab commander Nuʿmān was able to outmaneuver his Sāsānian counterpart Fīrūzan through the use of superior tactics rather than misleading rumors. The numerically superior Persians had been deployed in a strong defensive position. This would not normally have been a strategy favored by the loosely disciplined Sāsānian forces, drawn from decentralized sources and led by an alliance of feudal nobles. Nuʿmān was accordingly able to draw out the Persians from their vantage point by skirmishing advances and then a general but cohesive retreat. During the Sāsānian pursuit Fīrūzan found his horsemen caught in extended order across a rough landscape and narrow passes. The highly motivated and well-mounted Muslims then rallied and counterattacked, inflicting very heavy losses on the disorganized Persians. Both Nuʿmān and Fīrūzan were reportedly killed in the final melee but the Sāsānian defeat was total. Fīrūzan then abandoned his position and pursued his foe. The pursuit proved to be a major tactical error because the Sāsānians were forced to fight on unfavourable ground. The Sāsānian army, caught between two mountain defiles, fought for two days and three nights. After heavy casualties were incurred on both sides, the Persians were defeated by the Arabs. Both Nuʿmān and Fīrūzan died in the battle.

Many of the Sāsānian nobles were deserting the Empire even before the battle commenced. Many of Yazdegerd's military and civilian officials had already abandoned him.

== Aftermath ==
Nahāvand marked the near dissolution of the Sasanian Imperial army, with the fall of the last of the grand marshals of the army and the rise of warlordism among the Persians. The Emperor Yazdegerd III attempted to raise troops by appealing to other neighbouring areas such as the princes of Tukharistan and Sogdia and eventually sent his son Peroz III to the Tang court, but without any success.

Yazdegerd hurriedly fled towards the east where he was ill-received by several Marzban (provincial governors) in the north, as well as in Merv, where the governor Mahoye openly showed his hostility to the Emperor. According to non-Muslim sources, Yazdegerd failed to rally enough support in Eastern Persia where the Sasanians were unpopular with the local population. Muslim sources, such as Tabari, reported that the province of Khorasan revolted against Sasanian rule, just as it had years earlier when the population had sided with Khosrau II's uncle Vistahm. When Yazdegerd was crowned in Estakhr, Persia had in fact three Kings ruling in different regions and Khorasan had not initially given support to Yazdegerd.

Before Yazdegerd had a chance to receive help from the Hepthalites and Turkish tribes, he was assassinated by a local miller in Merv in 651. Thereafter, Yazdegerd's son Peroz attempted to re-establish the Sasanian empire against the Rashidun Caliphate and its successor, the Umayyad Caliphate, though the plan did not develop, as Peroz ultimately died in China.

== Sources ==
- Ali, Adam (2011). "Iran, Arab Conquest of (636-671)". In Mikaberidze, Alexander (ed.). Conflict and Conquest in the Islamic World: A Historical Encyclopedia. Vol. 1. ABC-CLIO. ISBN 978-1598843361.
- Crawford, Peter (2013). The War of the Three Gods: Romans, Persians and the Rise of Islam. Barnsley: Pen and Sword. ISBN 978-1-84884-612-8.
- Daniel, Elton L. (2001). The History of Iran. Greenwood Press. ISBN 9780313307317.
- Katouzian, Homa (2012). Iranian History and Politics: The Dialectic of State and Society. Routledge. ISBN 9781134430956.
- Morony, Michael G. (2012). "Iran in the Early Islamic Period". In Daryaee, Touraj (ed.). The Oxford Handbook of Iranian History. Oxford University Press. ISBN 9780199732159.
- Pourshariati, Parvaneh (2008). Decline and Fall of the Sasanian Empire: The Sasanian-Parthian Confederacy and the Arab Conquest of Iran. London and New York: I.B. Tauris. ISBN 978-1-84511-645-3.
- Rezakhani, Khodadad (2007). "Arab Conquests and Sasanian Iran". History Today (April).
- Olbrycht, Marek J. (2016). "Manpower Resources and Army Organisation in the Arsakid Empire". Ancient Society. 46: 291–338.
