= Agha Ibrahim Akram =

Pakistani general and historian (1923-89)

Lieutenant General A. I. Akram HI(M) SI(M) SK
- اے آئی اکرم

Founding President Institute of Regional Studies
- In office November 1981 – 4 March 1989

Ambassador of Pakistan to Madrid
- In office 14 May 1978 – 30 September 1980

6th Colonel Commandant Frontier Force Regiment
- In office 20 September 1973 – 28 August 1974
- Preceded by: Attiqur Rahman
- Succeeded by: Iqbal Khan

Deputy Martial Law Administrator Zone F (North-West Frontier Province)
- In office 6 July 1971 – 6 July 1972
- President: Yahya Khan; Zulfikar Ali Bhutto

Chief Instructor Staff College, Quetta
- In office 17 September 1960 – 11 September 1965
- Succeeded by: Amjad Ali Chaudhri

Personal details
- Born: Agha Ali Ibrahim Akram; 22 September 1923 Ludhiana, Punjab Province (British India)
- Died: 4 March 1989 (aged 65) Islamabad, Pakistan
- Children: 3
- Education: Government College, Lahore; Staff College, Quetta

Military service
- Branch/service: British Indian Army (1942-1947); Pakistan Army (1947-1978)
- Years of service: 1942–1978
- Rank: Lieutenant General
- Unit: 13th Frontier Force Rifles; Tochi Scouts; Piffers
- Commands: Frontier Force Regiment; 7th Infantry Division
- Battles/wars: World War II; Burma Campaign; Indo-Pakistani War of 1947; Indo-Pakistani War of 1965; Indo-Pakistani War of 1971
- Service number: PA-911
- Writing career
- Genres: Military history Islamic history
- Notable works: The Sword of Allah, Khalid Bin Al-Waleed, His Life and Campaign. 2006. (1970); The Muslim Conquest of Persia. (1975); The Muslim Conquest of Egypt and North Africa. (1977); The Muslim Conquest of Spain. 1980. (1980); The Falcon of The Quraish Abdur Rahman The Immigrant of Spain. (1991); The Rise of Cordoba. (1992)

Agha Ali Ibrahim Akram (Note: Urdu: آغا علی ابراہیم اکرم) (22 September 1923 — 4 March 1989) better known as A. I. Akram, was a Pakistani former three-star rank general, military strategist, historian, diplomat, and one of Pakistan's most influential military historians.

In the 1980s, he was a well-known defence analyst and expert. His most popular work was his biography of Khalid ibn al-Walid, The Sword of Allah, which he published while serving in the military. For several years, it was compulsory reading in the Pakistan Army for admission into the Command and Staff College Quetta and has been on the leadership syllabus in the Malaysian Army. Akram was once seen as a close confidant and conceptual adviser of President Zia-ul-Haq.

He served in several key positions including as Pakistan's Permanent Military Representative to the Central Treaty Organization in Ankara, sixth Colonel Commandant of the Frontier Force Regiment, Deputy Martial Law Administrator of Zone F (Note: The North-West Frontier Province) under Presidents General Yahya Khan and Zulfikar Ali Bhutto, General Officer Commanding 7th Infantry Division, Military Secretary at GHQ, and Colonel Staff HQ 15th Division.

Akram dedicated his books, The Muslim Conquest of Egypt and North Africa to his son Hassan, The Muslim Conquest of Spain to his son Masood, The Falcon of The Quraish: Abdur Rahman The Immigrant of Spain to his brother Mahmud, and The Rise of Cordoba to his late wife Loge. He was fluent in Urdu, English, Farsi, Arabic, and Spanish, learning the latter two for research.

Throughout the 1980s, Akram was vocal about his opposition to nuclear weapons, suggesting that Pakistan and other developing countries should use their resources towards generating nuclear energy. He expected that by the end of the 20th century, only about 10 countries would have nuclear weapons.

== Early life ==
Agha Ali Ibrahim Akram was born in Ludhiana on 22 September 1923, his father was an Indian Police Officer. Akram graduated from Government College, Lahore in 1942 and joined the British Indian Army. His brother, Agha Masud Akram, was a Major General in the Pakistan Army.

== Personal life ==
He was married to Loge, who died a few years before him. They have three children, daughter Yasmin, and sons Hassan and Masood.

In his memoirs, Inamul Haque Khan recalled that Akram was a well-read person who used to discuss philosophy and Allama Iqbal's poetry.

== Military career ==
=== British Indian Army and World War II ===
Akram was commissioned as a second lieutenant in the 13th Frontier Force Rifles of the British Indian Army on 26 November 1942, receiving a promotion on 26 August 1943 as a War substantive Lieutenant.

During World War II, Akram saw action in Burma and was promoted to Acting Captain on 31 December 1944. He received a promotion on 1 January 1945 as Temporary Captain and was appointed as the Quartermaster of the 14th Battalion of the 55th Coke's Rifles (Frontier Force).

=== Pakistan Army ===
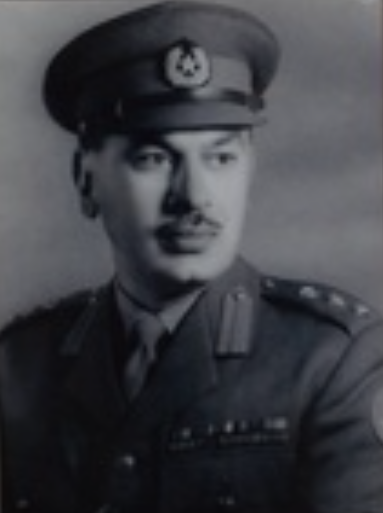
Colonel Akram's portrait at the Staff College, Quetta as Chief Instructor, 1960

After the Partition of British India in August 1947, Akram opted to join the Pakistan Army and commanded a company of the Tochi Scouts of the Frontier Corps in the First Kashmir War. He was later transferred to the Piffers regiment.

In September 1949, Pakistan was among several countries which received an invitation to attend the Harbnen Medal presentation by the Royal Institute of Public Health and Hygiene of the United Kingdom. The Government of Pakistan accepted the invitation and sent Major A. I. Akram as a representative. By 1951, he was the Assistant Army Liaison officer of Pakistan at the High Commission of Pakistan, London.

Colonel Akram taught military history as Chief Instructor at Staff College, Quetta from 17 September 1960 to 11 September 1965, during which he felt that there was a lack of detailed, clear and objective literature on Muslim military history. It was at this time when he decided to fill the void himself and began working on the biography of Khalid bin Walid, The Sword of Allah.

Colonel Akram was appointed as Colonel Staff HQ 15 Division on 20 September during the 1965 war.

Brigadier Akram was the Parade commander of the Pakistan Day Parade of 1967 and held the position of Administrator for Sub-Sector No. 1, overseeing the civil districts of Bannu and D.I. Khan, as well as the tribal territories governed by these districts in 1969.

His first book, The Sword of Allah is about the life and campaigns of Khalid ibn al-Walid which was published during his army service in 1970 after a five year effort, including visiting battle-fields in Lebanon, Syria, Jordan, Iraq, Kuwait and Saudi Arabia for research. It has two English editions and has been translated into Urdu, Arabic, German, French and Bahasa.

On 6 July 1971, President Yahya Khan appointed Lt General Akram as the Deputy Administrator of Martial Law - Zone F, North-West Frontier Province, and served in the role until 6 July 1972.

During a parade in Multan, on 2 May 1974, both the 7 FF and 10 FF received their regimental colors together. Major General A.I. Akram, the Colonel Commandant of the FF Regiment, made the presentation.

While Akram was Pakistan's Permanent Military Deputy to CENTO, he published his second book The Muslim Conquest of Persia in 1975 after a four year research effort including visiting battlefields in Iran and discussing with Iranian scholars.

The Muslim Conquest of Egypt and North Africa was his third book, published in 1977, which also took four years of preparations and visits to Egypt and Tunisia.

==== Hamoodur Rehman Commission ====
Major General Akram was not involved in the Bangladesh genocide as he was posted at the Western Front to defend Pakistan's borders against the Indian Army. However, he later appeared as Witness Number 139 in the Hamoodur Rahman Commission report.

==== Consideration for the role of Chief of Army Staff ====
In March 1976, several generals were in consideration for the role of Chief of Army Staff to succeed Tikka Khan. In order of seniority, these officers were Muhammad Shariff, Muhammed Akbar Khan, Aftab Ahmad Khan, Azmat Baksh Awan, Agha Ibrahim Akram, Majeed Malik, and Ghulam Jilani Khan. Prime Minister Zulfikar Ali Bhutto had a personal rapport with all these generals but superseded them for the most junior officer, Muhammad Zia-ul-Haq, who later hanged Bhutto after overthrowing his government in the 1977 Pakistani military coup.

Akram retired from the Pakistan Army on 8 April 1978.

== Military research papers ==
Akram, A. I. (1958). "On Relative Strengths". Pakistan Army Journal.

== Diplomatic career ==
On 9 April 1978, Akram assumed charge as Officer on Special Duty Grade 20 at the Ministry of Foreign Affairs. He was appointed as the Ambassador of Pakistan to Madrid on 12 May 1978 by President Zia-ul-Haq.

Here, Akram learned Spanish and wrote his book The Muslim Conquest of Spain, his final book published during his lifetime, in 1980. To research for writing all these books he learned Arabic, Persian and Spanish and collected an impressive library of historical works. His tenure ended on 30 September 1980.

== Later life ==
On 24 March 1981, Akram was elected as Chairman Rawalpindi Club. He founded the Institute of Regional Studies in November 1981 or March 1982 and remained its president till his death.

On 27 February 1984, Akram disclosed that President Zia-ul-Haq had offered India to send its military team to Pakistan to evaluate the latter's defence requirements and suggest how much of armed strength Pakistan should possess.

== Death ==
He died on 4 March 1989 in Islamabad, Pakistan at the age of 65.

=== Posthumous book releases ===
His final books, The Falcon of The Quraish: Abdur Rahman The Immigrant of Spain and The Rise of Cordoba, were published after his death.

== Books ==
- Akram, A. I. (1970). The Sword of Allah Khalid Bin Al-Waleed, His Life and Campaigns.
- Akram, A. I. (1975). The Muslim Conquest of Persia.
- Akram, A. I. (1977). The Muslim Conquest of Egypt and North Africa.
- Akram, A. I. (1980). The Muslim Conquest of Spain. Army Education Press G.H.Q., Rawalpindi.
- Akram, A. I. (1991). The Falcon of The Quraish: Abdur Rahman The Immigrant of Spain. Army Education Press G.H.Q., Rawalpindi.
- Akram, A. I. (1992). The Rise of Cordoba. Army Education Press G.H.Q., Rawalpindi.

== Awards and decorations ==
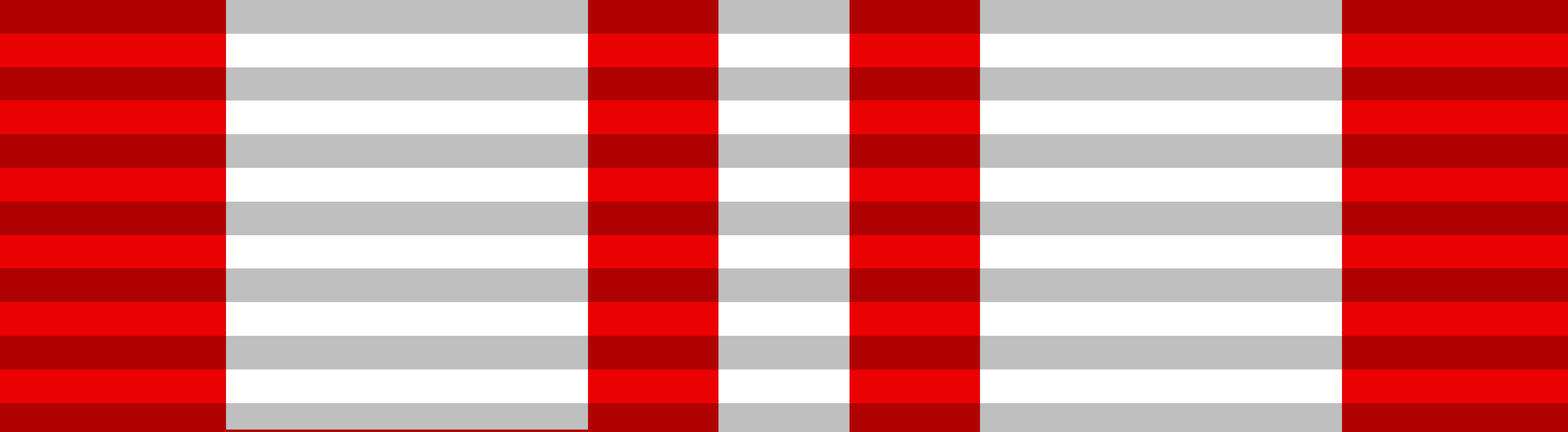

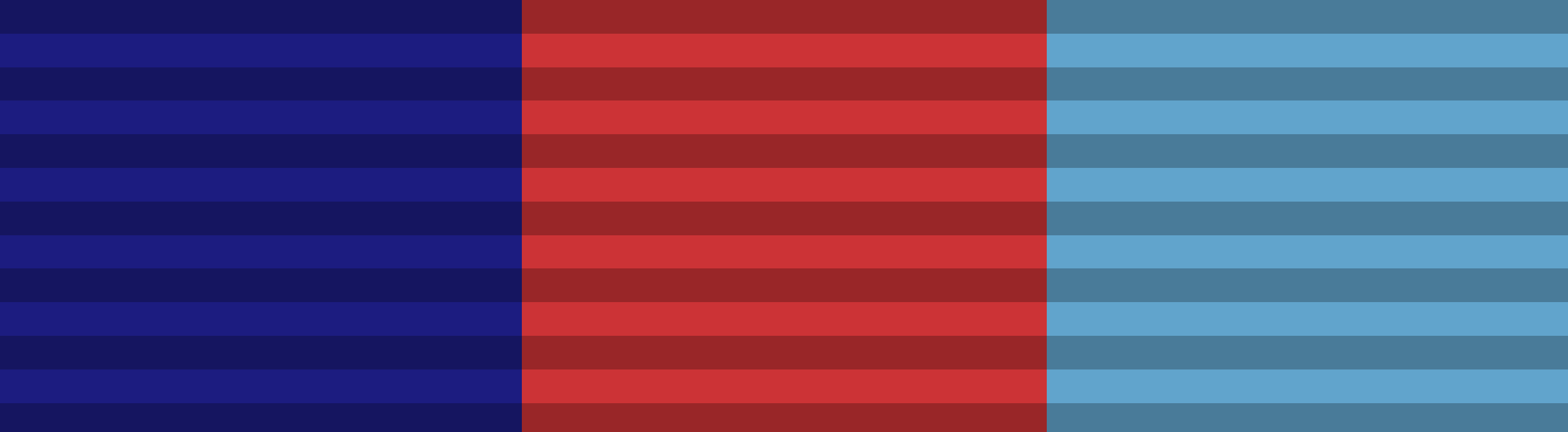

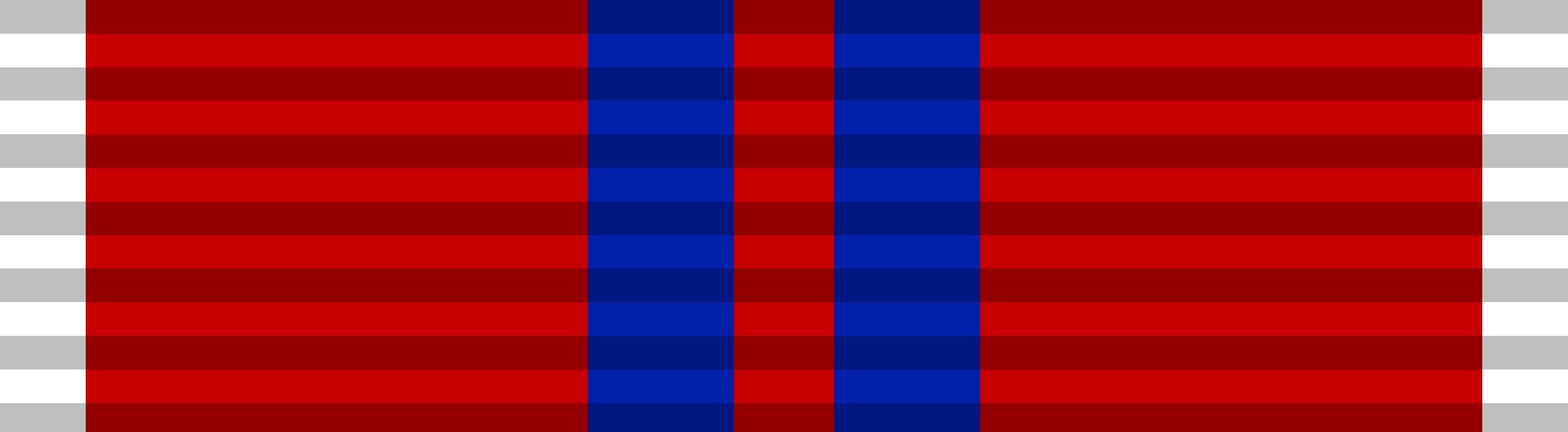

Hilal-e-Imtiaz (Military) (Crescent of Excellence)	Sitara-e-Imtiaz (Military) (Star of Excellence)		Sitara-e-Khidmat (Star of Service) (SK)
Sitara-e-Harb 1965 War (War Star 1965)	Sitara-e-Harb 1971 War (War Star 1971)	Tamgha-e-Jang 1965 War (War Medal 1965)	Tamgha-e-Diffa (Defence Medal): 1. 1965 War Clasp; 2. 1971 War Clasp
Tamgha-e-Jang 1971 War (War Medal 1971)	Pakistan Medal (Pakistan Tamgha) 1947	Tamgha-e-Qayam-e-Jamhuria (Republic Commemoration Medal) 1956	1939-1945 Star
Burma Star	War Medal 1939-1945	India Service Medal 1939–1945	Queen Elizabeth II Coronation Medal (1953)

=== Foreign Decorations ===
Foreign Awards
UK	1939-1945 Star
UK	Burma Star
UK	War Medal 1939-1945
UK	India Service Medal 1939–1945
UK	Queen Elizabeth II Coronation Medal
