= Al-Rabadha =

Settlement in Saudi Arabia

Coordinates: 24.6319°N 41.2906°E

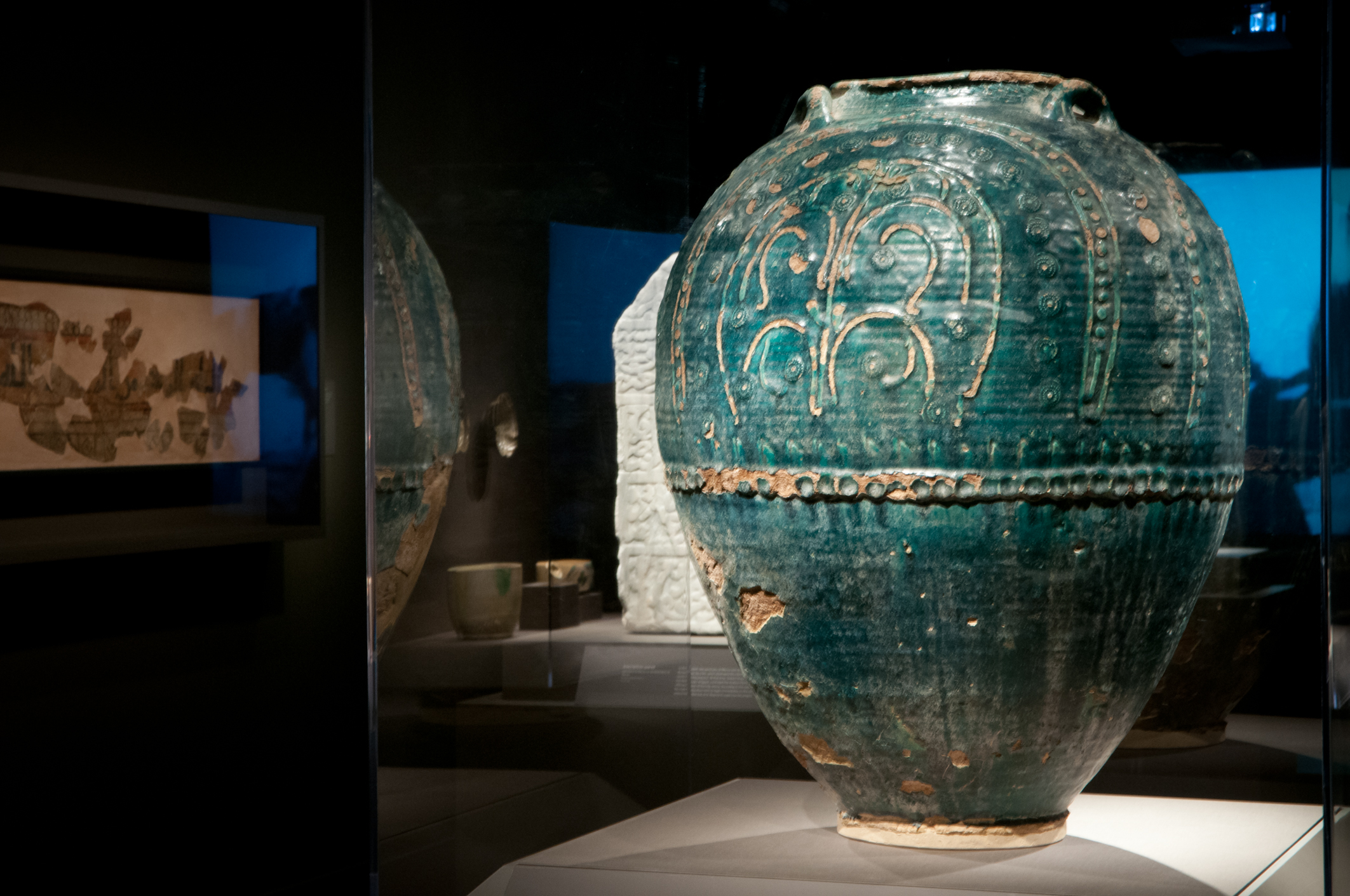
A Jar from Al-Rabadha

Al-Rabadha (Arabic الربذة) is a settlement in Saudi Arabia located some 200 km to the north-east of Medina on the pilgrim route from Kufa to Mecca, known as Darb Zubaydah. The archaeological excavations directed by King Saud University have shown that Al-Rabadha yields important information for the early phases of Islamic culture. The town is also known as the place where Abu Dharr al-Ghifari spent his last years and died.

The excavations at Al-Rabadha give a good insight into urban housing in the Early Islamic Period. The site is dominated by a palace structure, consisting of 13 rooms all with doors opening on a central courtyard. Each room is likely to have served a different purpose, with evidence for ovens, grain storage and a furnace for glass-making found in separate areas. A more typical house from the site is similar in its design, but smaller in area, with divided rooms averaging 3x2m. In contrast with Western Europe, timber is not used in construction, with all houses being made from sun-dried mud brick and having stone foundations.
