= Al-Hunakiyah =

Governorate of Saudi Arabia

- City and Governorate
- Location of Al-Hunakiyah in Medina Province

- Location in Saudi Arabia
- Coordinates: 24°53′N 40°33′E
- Country: Saudi Arabia
- Province: Medina Province

Government
  - Type: Municipality
  - Body: Al-Hunakiyah Municipality

Population (2022)
  - Metro: 43,256 (Al-Hunakiyah Governorate)
- Time zone: UTC+03:00 (SAST)
- Area code: 014

Al-Hunakiyah also spelled as Al-Hinakiyah (Arabic: الحناكية) is a city and governorate in Medina Province, Saudi Arabia.

== See also ==
- List of governorates of Saudi Arabia
