= Qatan =

Qatan is a location in Saudi Arabia. The Banu Asad ibn Khuzaymah tribe (not to be confused with the Banu Asad tribe), were the residents of Qatan, in the vicinity of Fayd, they were a powerful tribe connected with the Quraysh. They resided near the hill of Qatan in Nejd. Muhammad, purportedly, received intelligence reports that they were planning a raid on Medina so he attacked them in the Expedition of Qatan. He dispatched a force of 150 men under the leadership of Abu Salama `Abd Allah ibn `Abd al-Asad to make a sudden attack on this tribe. On the first day of Muharram.

== See also ==
- List of battles of Muhammad
