= Najd =

Region in central Saudi Arabia

Najd نجد (Arabic)
- Historical region of Arabia
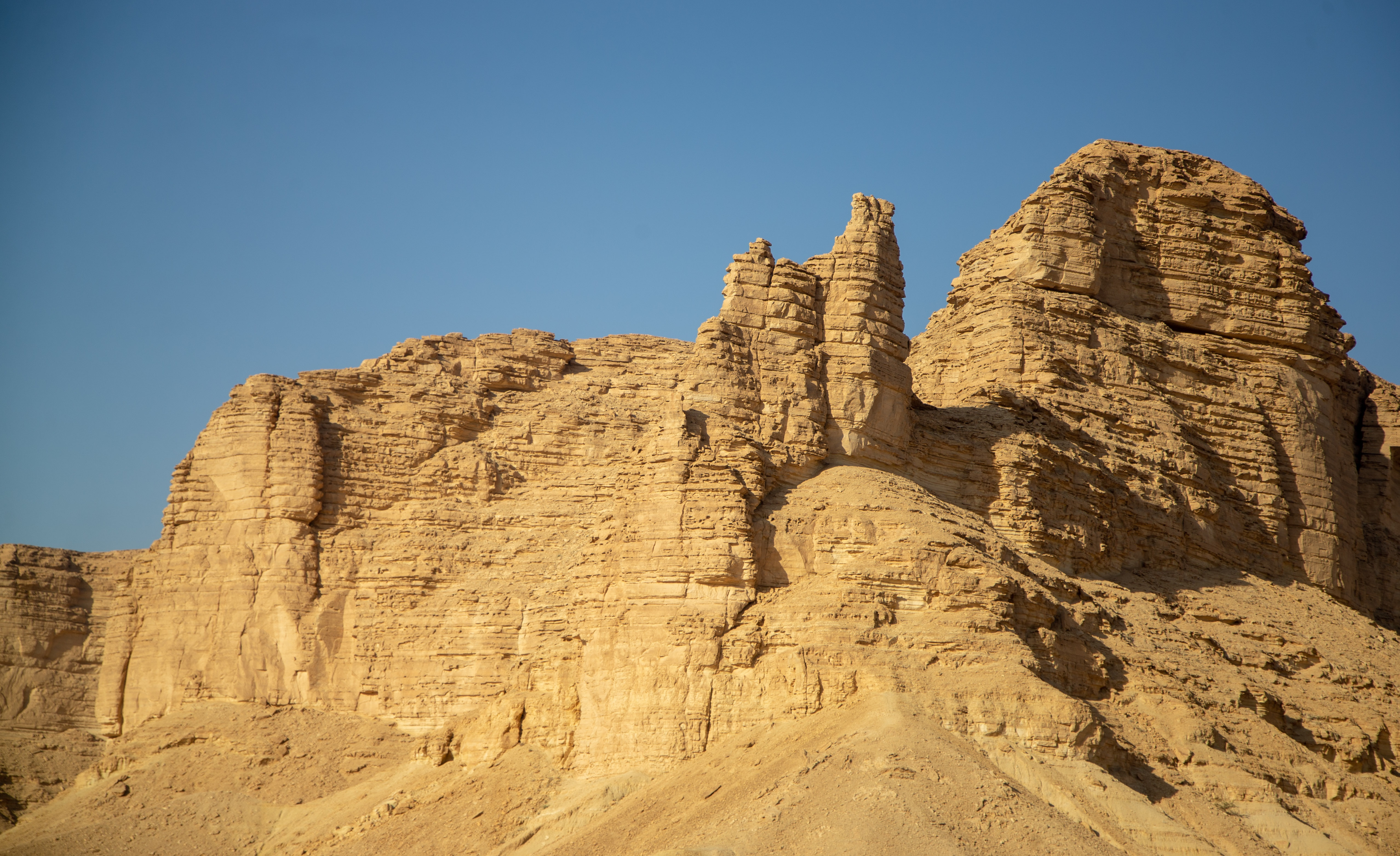
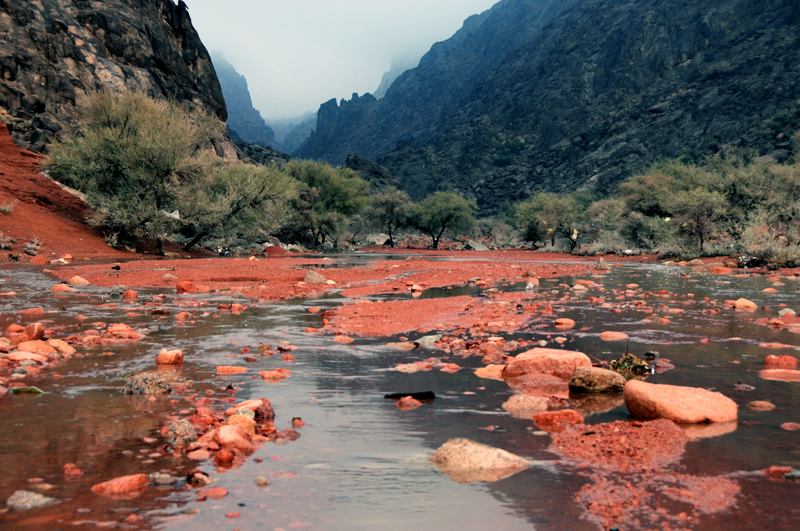
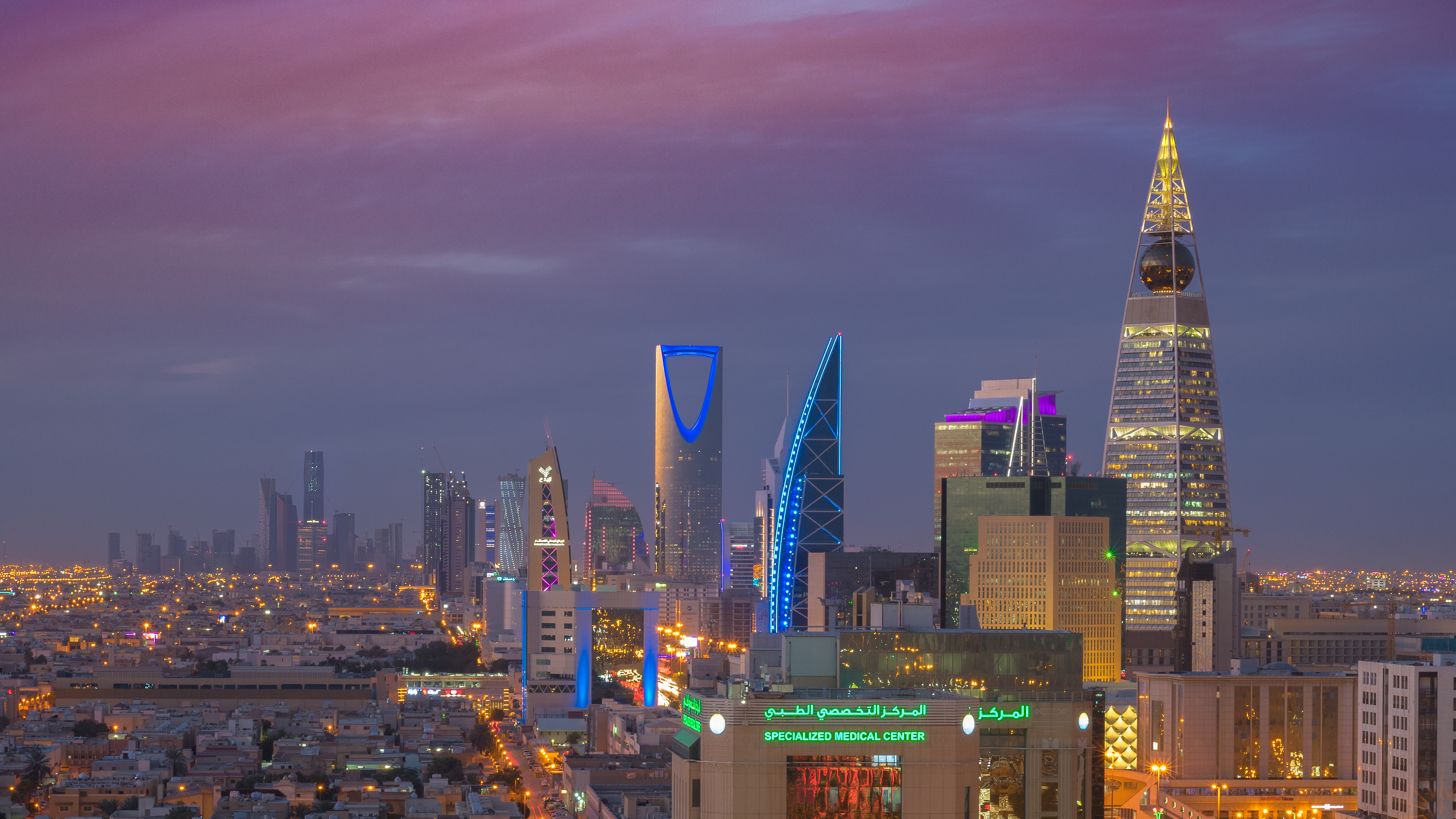
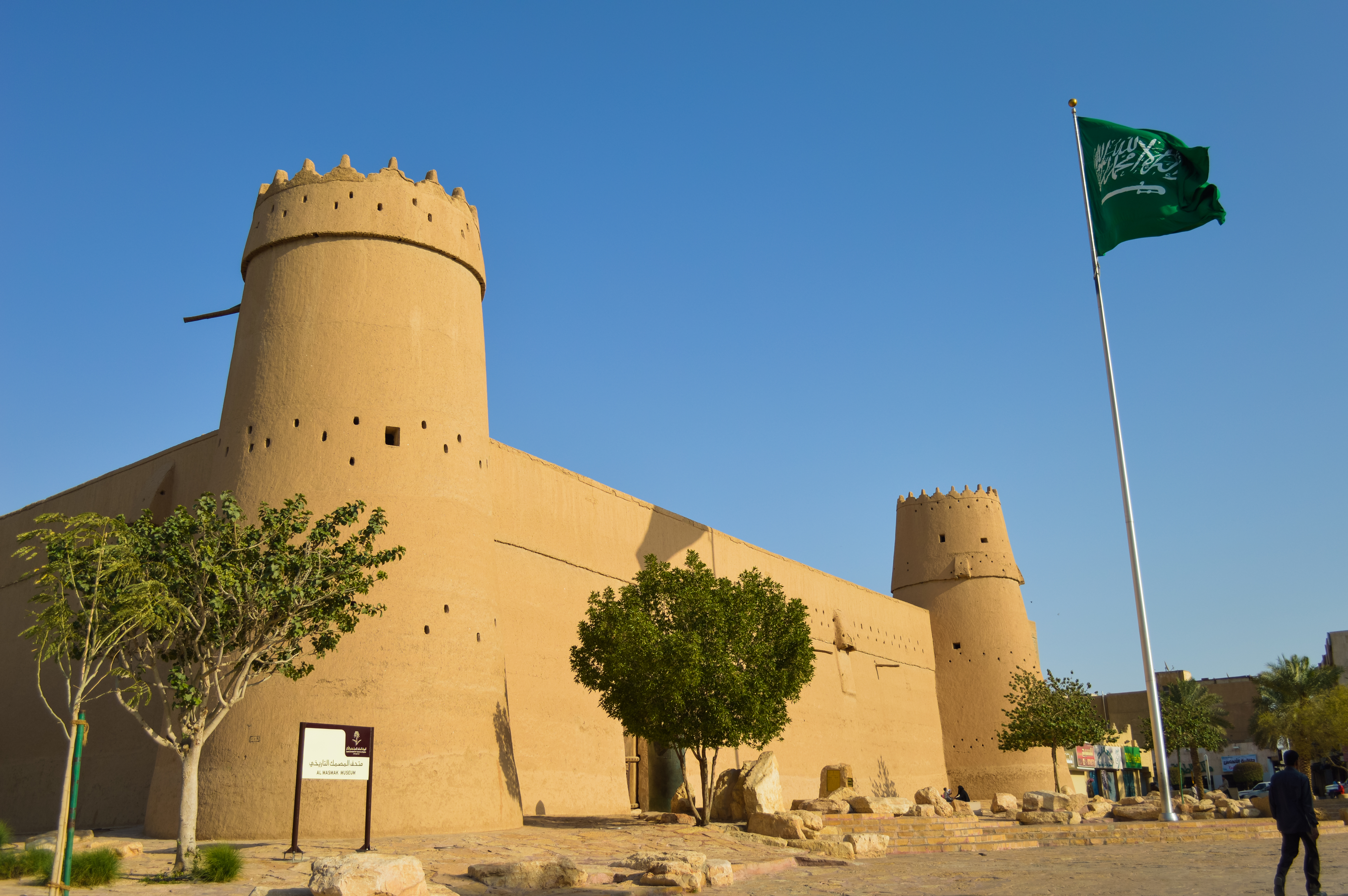
- Tuwaiq Shammar Mountains of Ha'il Skyline of Riyadh Al Masmak Palace

- Map of the Najd region in the central region of the Arabian Peninsula
- Coordinates: 25°N 44°E
- Country: Saudi Arabia
- Largest city: Riyadh
- Provinces: Riyadh, Al-Qassim, Ha'il

Population (2022 census)
  - Total: 10,627,701

Najd (Note: /nad͡ʒd/, Arabic: إقليم نجد, romanized: Iqlīm Najd), alternatively romanized as Nejd, is a historical region of the Arabian Peninsula that includes most of the central region of Saudi Arabia. It is roughly bounded by the Hejaz region to the west, the Nafud desert in al-Jawf to the north, the ad-Dahna Desert in al-Ahsa to the east, and the Rub' al-Khali to the south, though it lacks precise boundaries due to varying geographical and political limits throughout history.

Administratively, Najd is divided into three main provinces. These include the Riyadh Province, which features Wadi Hanifa, the Tuwaiq escarpment, and the easterly region of Yamama, home to the Saudi capital, Riyadh, since 1824, as well as the Sudairi region, which has its capital in Majmaah; the Qassim Province, known for its fertile oases and date palm orchards spread out in the highlands along the Wadi Rummah, with its capital in Buraidah, the second-largest Najdi city; and the northerly Ḥa'il Province, which features the mountains of Jabal Shammar and the Tayy capital of Ḥaʼil.

The Najd region is home to approximately one-third of Saudi Arabia's modern population. It is the home of the House of Saud, from which it pursued its unification with Hejaz since the time of the Emirate of Diriyah.

== Toponymy ==
The term Najd (Arabic: نجد) literally translates to "highland" in Arabic.

== History ==
=== Ancient history ===
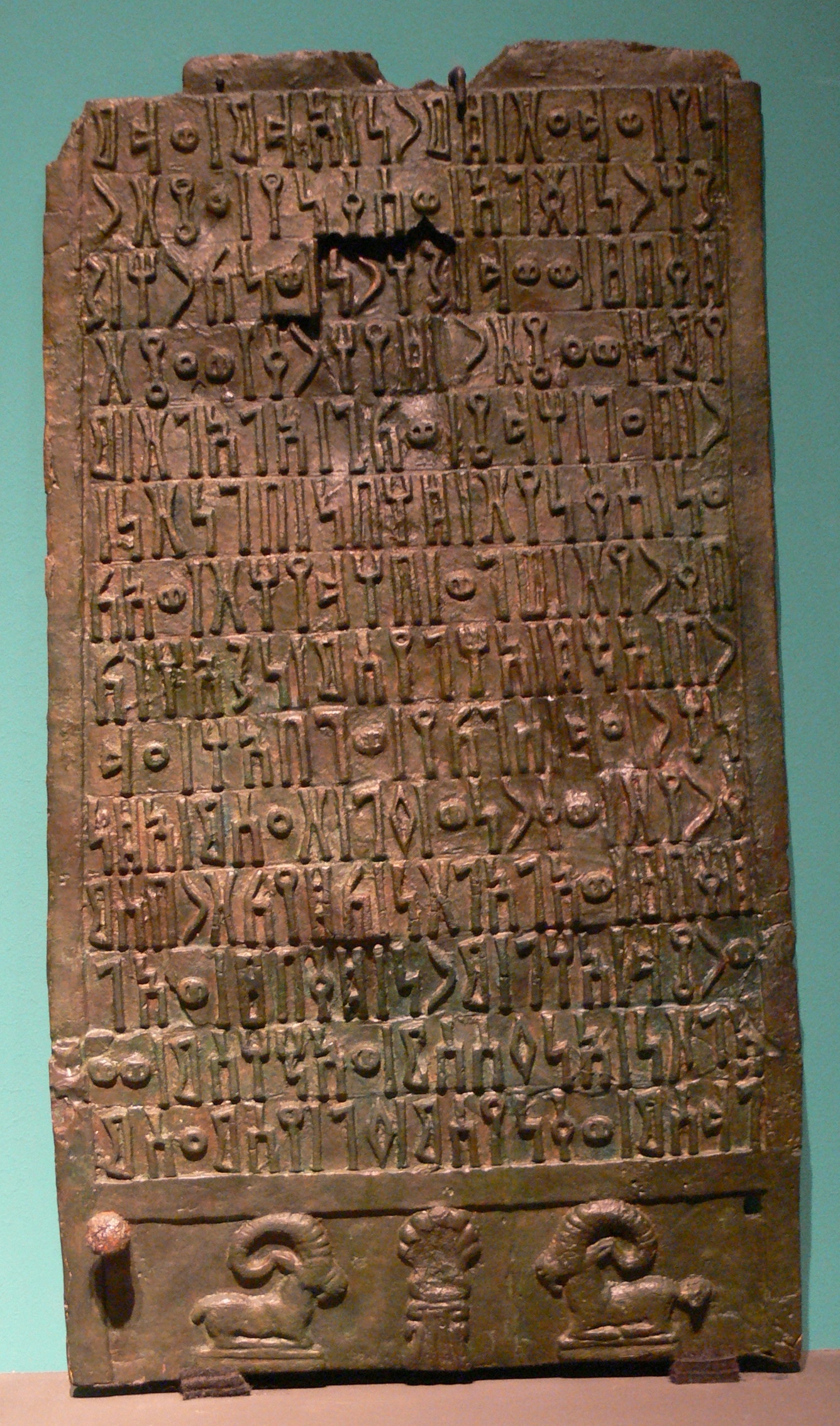
Plaque with a Ma'inic inscription and two ibexes (1st century BC – 1st century AD), Qaryat al-Faw

The Najd region is home to Al-Magar, which was an advanced prehistoric culture of the Neolithic period whose center lay in modern-day southwestern Najd. Al-Magar was possibly one of the first cultures in the world to practice widespread agriculture and the domestication of animals, particularly horses, before climate changes in the region resulted in desertification. Radiocarbon dating of several objects discovered at Al-Magar indicate an age of about 9,000 years.

In November 2017, hunting scenes showing images of what appear to be domesticated dogs resembling the Canaan dog and wearing leashes were discovered in Shuwaymis, an area about 370 km southwest of the city of Ha'il. Dated at 8,000 years before the present, these are thought to be the earliest known depictions of dogs in the world.

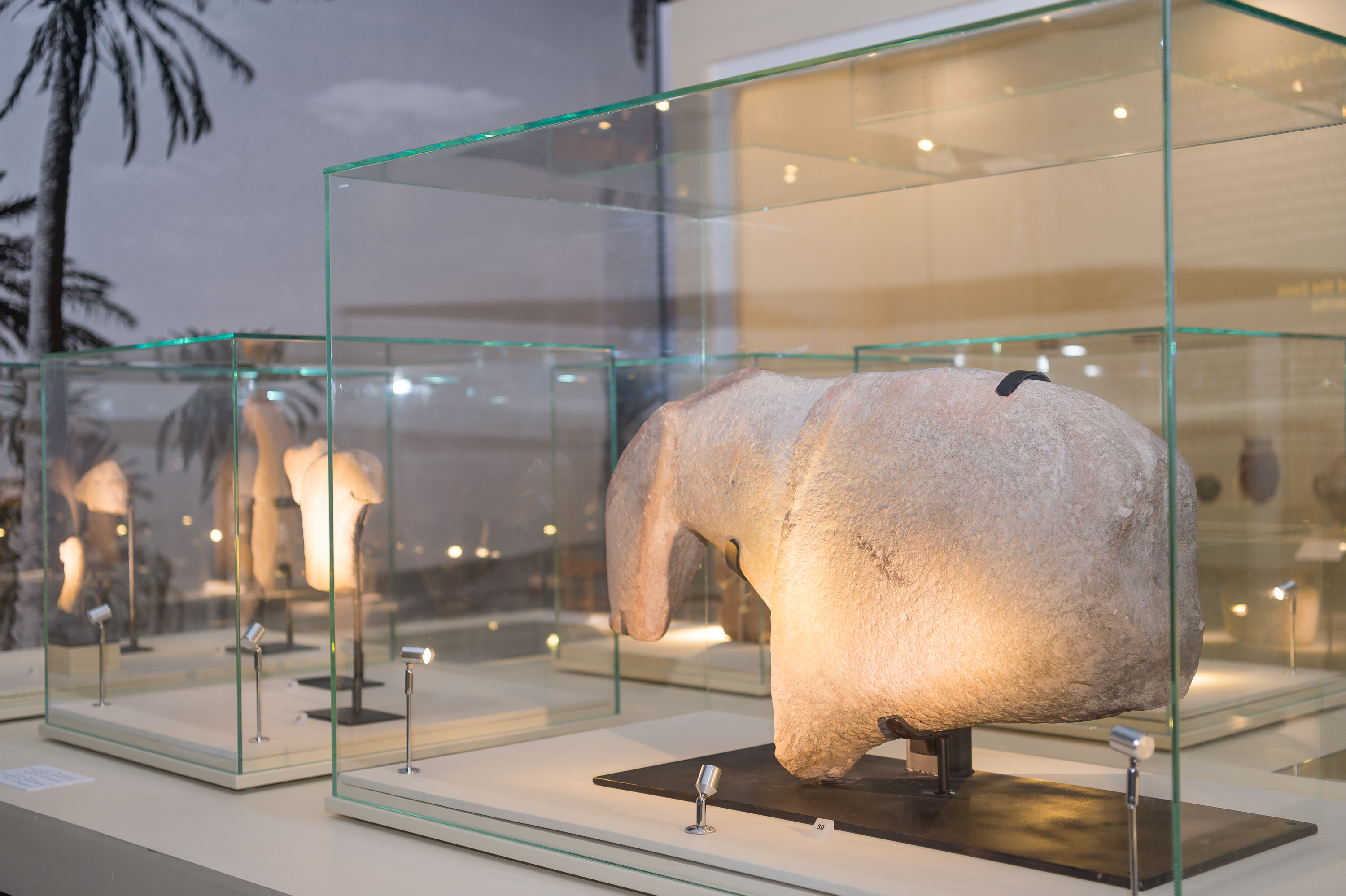
A large ancient stone carving, dating back to 8100 BC, of an equid—an animal belonging to the horse family, found at Al-Magar. The piece itself, measuring 86 cms long by 18 cms thick and weighing more than 135kg., is a large sculptural fragment that appears to show the head, muzzle, shoulder and withers of a horse.

In the 5th century AD, the tribes of North Arabia became a major threat to the trade line between Yemen and Syria. The Ḥimyarites of Sheba decided to establish a vassal state that controlled Central and North Arabia. The Kindites, mentioned in Greek sources as the Chinedakolpitai (Greek: Χινεδακολπιται), gained strength and numbers to play that role and in AD 425 the Ḥimyarite king Ḥasan ibn 'Amr ibn Tubba’ made Ḥujr 'Akīl al-Murār ibn 'Amr the first King (Ḥujr) of Kindah. They established the Kingdom of Kinda in Najd in central Arabia, which was unlike the organized states of Yemen: its kings exercised an influence over a number of associated tribes more by personal prestige than by coercive settled authority. Their first capital was Qaryat Dhāt Kāhil, today known as Qaryat al-Fāw.

The Ghassānids, Lakhmids and Kindites were all Kahlānī and Qaḥṭānī kingdoms which thrived in Najd. In the 5th and 6th centuries AD, the Kindites made the first real concerted effort to unite all the tribes of Central Arabia through alliances, and focused on wars with the Lakhmids. Al-Ḥārith ibn 'Amr, the most famous of their kings, finally succeeded in capturing the Lakhmid capital of al-Ḥirah in southern modern-day Iraq. Later, however, in about 529, al-Mundhir recaptured the city and put King Ḥārith and about fifty members of his family to death.

In 525, the Aksumites invaded Ḥimyar, and this had a knock-on effect with the Kindites, who lost the support of the Ḥimyarites. Within three years the Kingdom of Kinda had split into four groups: Asad, Taghlib, Qays and Kinānah, each led by a prince of Kindah. These small principalities were then overthrown in the 530s and 540s in a series of uprisings of the Adnani tribes of Najd and Hijaz. In 540, the Lakhmids destroyed all the Kindite settlements in Nejd, forcing the majority of them to move to Yemen. The Kindites and most of the Arab tribes switched their alliances to the Lakhmids.

=== Islamic history ===
In the 7th century, Muhammad carried out military expeditions in the area. The first was the Nejd Caravan Raid against the Quraysh, which took place in 624. The Meccans led by Safwan ibn Umayya, who lived on trade, left in summer for Syria for their seasonal trade business. After Muhammad received intelligence about the Caravan's route, he ordered Zayd ibn Haritha to go after the Caravan, and they successfully raided it and captured 100,000 dirhams worth of booty.

The Invasion of Najd happened in Rabi II or Jumada I 4 AH (October 625 AD). Muhammad led his fighters to Najd to scare off some tribes whose intentions were suspicious. Some scholars say the expedition of Dhat al-Riqa took place in Nejd as part of this invasion.

The most authentic opinion according to "Saif ar-Rahman al-Mubararakpuri", however, is that the Dhat ar-Riqa' campaign took place after the fall of Khaybar (and not as part of the invasion of Najd). This is supported by the fact that Abu Hurayra and Abu Musa al-Ash'ari witnessed the battle. Abu Hurayra embraced Islam only some days before Khaybar, and Abu Musa al-Ash'ari came back from Abyssinia (modern day Ethiopia), and joined Muhammad at Khaybar. The rules relating to the prayer of fear, which Muhammad observed at the Dhat Ar-Riqa' campaign, were revealed at the Asfan invasion and, these scholars say, took place after al-Khandaq.

The Expedition of Qatan also took place in Nejd. The Banu Asad ibn Khuzaymah tribe (not to be confused with the Banu Asad tribe) was a powerful tribe connected with the Quraysh. They resided near the hill of Katan, in the vicinity of Fayd, in Nejd. Muhammad received intelligence reports that they were planning a raid on Medina, so he dispatched a force of 150 men under the leadership of Abu Salama 'Abd Allah ibn 'Abd al-Asad to make a sudden attack on this tribe.

==== Ridda wars ====
After Prophet Muhammad's death, previously dormant tensions between the Meccan immigrants, the Muhajirun, and the Medinan converts, the Ansar, threatened to split the Ummah. Other Arabian tribes also wished to revert from Islam to local leadership and split from Medina's control; in some places, people such as Al-Aswad Al-Ansi and Musaylima claimed prophethood and started to establish leaderships in opposition to Medina.

The Ansar, the leaders of the tribes of Medina, met in a hall or house called saqifah, to discuss whom they would support as their new leader. When Abu Bakr was informed of the meeting, he, Umar, Abu Ubaidah ibn al-Jarrah and a few others rushed to prevent the Ansar from making a premature decision. During the meeting Umar declared that Abu Bakr should be the new leader, and declared his allegiance to Abu Bakr, followed by Abu Ubaidah ibn al-Jarrah, and thus Abu Bakr became the first caliph.

Apostasy and rebellion in central Arabia were led by Musaylima in the fertile region of Yamamah. He was mainly supported by the powerful tribe of Banu Hanifa. At Buzakha in north central Arabia, another claimed prophet, Tulayha, a tribal chief of Banu Asad, led the rebellion against Medina, aided by the allied tribes of Banu Ghatafan, the Hawazin, and the Tayy. At Najd, Malik ibn Nuweira led the tribes of Banu Tamim against the authority of Medina.

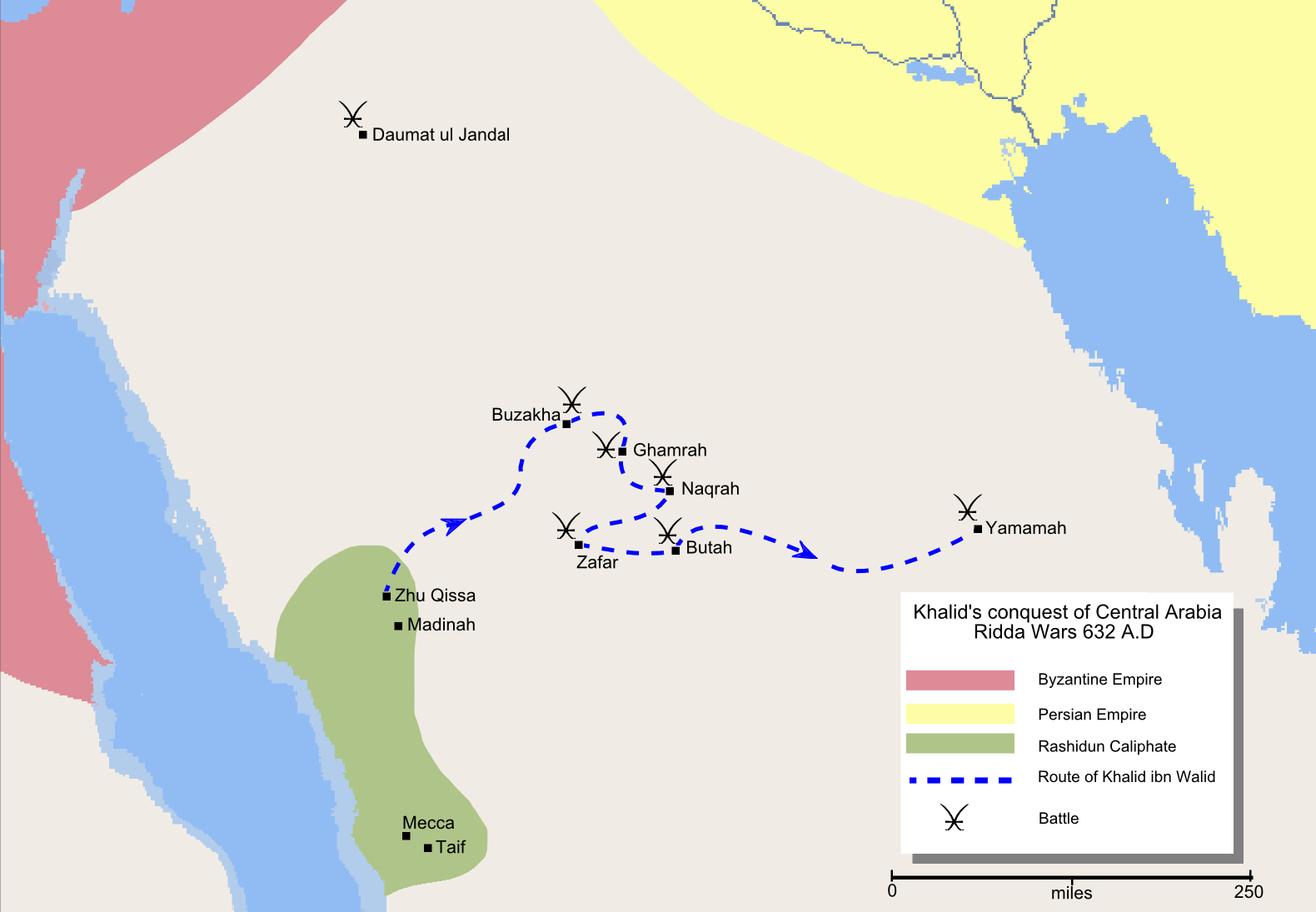
Map detailing the route of Khalid ibn Walid's conquest of Arabia

On receiving intelligence of the Muslims' preparations, Tulayha too prepared for a battle, and was further reinforced by the contingents of the allied tribes. Before launching Khalid ibn Al-Walid against Tulayha, Abu Bakr sought ways and means of reducing the latter's strength, so that the battle could be fought with the maximum prospects of victory. Nothing could be done about the tribes of Banu Asad and Banu Ghatafan, which stood solidly behind Tulayha, but the Tayy were not so staunch in their support of Tulayha, and their chief, Adi ibn Hatim, was a devout Muslim. Adi was appointed by Abu Bakr to negotiate with the tribal elders to withdraw their contingent from Tulayha's army. The negotiations were a success, and Adi brought with him 500 horsemen of his tribe to reinforce Khalid's army.

Khalid next marched against another apostate tribe, Jadila. Here again, Adi ibn Hatim offered his services to persuade the tribe to submit without bloodshed. Bani Jadila submitted, and their 1000 warriors joined Khalid's army. Khalid, now much stronger than when he had left Zhu Qissa, marched for Buzakha. There, in mid-September 632, he defeated Tulayha in the Battle of Buzakha. The remaining army of Tulayha retreated to Ghamra, 20 miles from Buzakha, and was defeated in the Battle of Ghamra in the third week of September.

Several tribes submitted to the Caliph after Khalid's decisive victories. Moving south from Buzakha, Khalid reached Naqra in October, with an army now 6000 strong, and defeated the rebel tribe of Banu Saleem in the Battle of Naqra. In the third week of October, Khalid defeated a tribal chieftess, Salma, in the battle of Zafar.

Afterwards, he moved to Najd against the rebel tribe of Banu Tamim and their Sheikh Malik ibn Nuwayrah. At Najd, getting the news of Khalid's decisive victories against apostates in Buzakha, many clans of Banu Tamim hastened to visit Khalid, but the Banu Yarbu', a branch of Banu Tamim, under their chief, Malik ibn Nuwayrah, hung back. Malik was a chief of some distinction: a warrior, noted for his generosity, and a famous poet. Bravery, generosity, and poetry were the three qualities most admired among the Arabs. At the time of Muhammad, he had been appointed as a tax collector for the tribe of Banu Tamim. As soon as Malik heard of the death of Muhammad he gave back all the tax to his tribespeople, saying "Now you are the owner of your wealth." Moreover, he was to be charged because he signed a pact with the anti-Islamic prophet Sajjah. This agreement stated that first, they would deal with local enemy tribes together, and then they would confront the state of Madinah.

His riders were stopped by Khalid's army at the town of Buttah. Khalid asked them about the signing of pact with Sajjah; they said it was just because they wanted revenge against their terrible enemies. When Khalid reached Najd he found no opposing army. He sent his cavalry to nearby villages and ordered them to call the Athaan to each party they meet.

Zirrar bin Azwar, a squadron leader, arrested the family of Malik, claiming they did not answer the call to prayer. Malik avoided direct contact with Khalid's army and ordered his followers to scatter, and he and his family apparently moved away across the desert. He refused to give zakat, hence differentiating between prayer and zakat. Nevertheless, Malik was accused of rebellion against the state of Medina. He was also to be charged for his entering in an anti-Caliphate alliance with the anti-Islamic prophetess Sajjah. Malik was arrested along with his clansmen.

Malik was asked by Khalid about his crimes. Malik's response was "your master said this, your master said that", referring to Abu Bakr. Khalid declared Malik a rebel apostate and ordered his execution. Khalid bin Walid killed Malik ibn Nuwayra.

Ikrimah ibn Abi-Jahl, one of the corps commanders, was instructed to make contact with Musaylima at Yamamah, but not to engage in fighting until Khalid joined him. Abu Bakr's intention in giving Ikrimah this mission was to tie Musaylima down at Yamamah. With Ikrimah on the horizon, Musaylima would remain in expectation of a Muslim attack, and thus not be able to leave his base. With Musaylima so committed, Khalid would be free to deal with the apostate tribes of north-central Arabia without interference from Yamamah. Meanwhile, Abu Bakr sent Shurhabil's corps to reinforce Ikrama at Yamamah.

However, Ikrimah attacked Musaylima's forces in early September 632 and was defeated. He wrote the details of his actions to Abu Bakr, who, both pained and angered by the rashness of Ikrimah and his disobedience, ordered him to proceed with his force to Oman to assist Hudaifa; once Hudaifa had completed his task, to march to Mahra to help Arfaja, and thereafter go to Yemen to help Muhajir.

Meanwhile, Abu Bakr sent orders to Khalid to march against Musaylima. Shurhabil's corps, that was stationed at Yamamah, was to reinforce Khalid's corps. In addition to this Abu Bakr assembled a fresh army of Ansar and Muhajireen in Medina that joined Khalid's corps at Butah. From Butah Khalid marched to Yamamah to join with Shurhabil's corps. Though Abu Bakr had instructed Shurhabil not to engage Musaylima's forces until the arrival of Khalid, shortly before the arrival of Khalid, Shurhabil engaged Musaylima's forces and was defeated too.

Khalid joined with the corps of Shurhabil early in December 632. The combined force of Muslims, now 13,000 strong, defeated Musaylima's army in the Battle of Yamamah, which was fought in the third week of December. The fortified city of Yamamah surrendered peacefully later that week. Khalid established his headquarters at Yamamah, from where he despatched columns to all over the plain of Aqraba to subdue the region around Yamamah and to kill or capture all who resisted. Thereafter all of central Arabia submitted to Medina. What remained of the apostasy in the less vital areas of Arabia was rooted out by the Muslims in a series of well-planned campaigns within five months.

==== Post–Ridda wars, until the 16th century ====
Muhammad's followers rapidly expanded the territory under Muslim rule beyond Arabia, conquering huge swathes of territory from the Iberian Peninsula in the west to modern day Pakistan in the east in a matter of decades. The bulk of the tribes that helped the Caliphate's expansion into Persia and the Levant were composed of Najdi tribes such as Banu Tamim. The Caliphate's use of these once-rebellious tribes allowed Abu Bakr and Umar to quickly deploy battle hardened men and experienced generals such as Al-Qa'qa' ibn Amr al-Tamimi into the front-lines against the Persians and Byzantines.

Najd soon became a politically peripheral region of the Muslim world as the focus shifted to the outside of the peninsula. Many of members of the conquering tribes of Najd soon shifted into the Levant, Persia and North Africa, playing a role in future conflicts in the caliphate, becoming governors and even birthing emirates such as the Aghlabids. Migrations continued throughout the centuries back and forth from Nejd to Iraq and the Levant, with many Najdi tribes reaching Khorosan and the Maghreb.

Najda bin Amir al-Hanafi, who is a Kharijite during the Umayyad dynasty, appeared and established an independent state in Najd, including Qatif in the province of Bahrain, taking advantage of the Najdis to complain about the Umayyad caliphs in 692, but his state did not last long, and the Umayyads regained control of Najd and became a subsidiary of Bahrain and was administered by a governor with one. Sources are very scarce about the situation of the region, and it seems that the slave trade flourished during the Abbasid Dynasty, and several rebellious movements appeared, including what happened during the days of Abu Ja'far Harun al-Wathiq bilallah and his dispatch of Musa ibn Bagha the Great Turk, who killed one thousand and two hundred inhabitants of Najd and restored the Abbasid state's control over the region again and then the Ukhaidriyya state appeared, a Zaydi state that became independent from the Abbasid Caliphate in 867 and ruled until at least 1051 In 925, the third Imam of Banu al-Ukhaidhir collaborated with Abu Tahir Suleiman al-Janabi, the leader of the Qarmatians in Al-Ahsa, to capture Kufa, but he was killed by the Qarmatians in 928 The region witnessed a bad period as a result of the cruelty of the Ukhaidris, and a large number of the inhabitants of Najd were displaced to different areas due to the poor conditions. Not many details are available after this period, until the 16th century.

=== Modern history ===
In the 16th century, the Ottomans added the Red Sea coast (the Hejaz, Asir and tried to add al-Ahsa) to the Empire and claimed suzerainty over the interior. It was an attempt to thwart the Portuguese from attacking the Red Sea (hence the Hejaz)

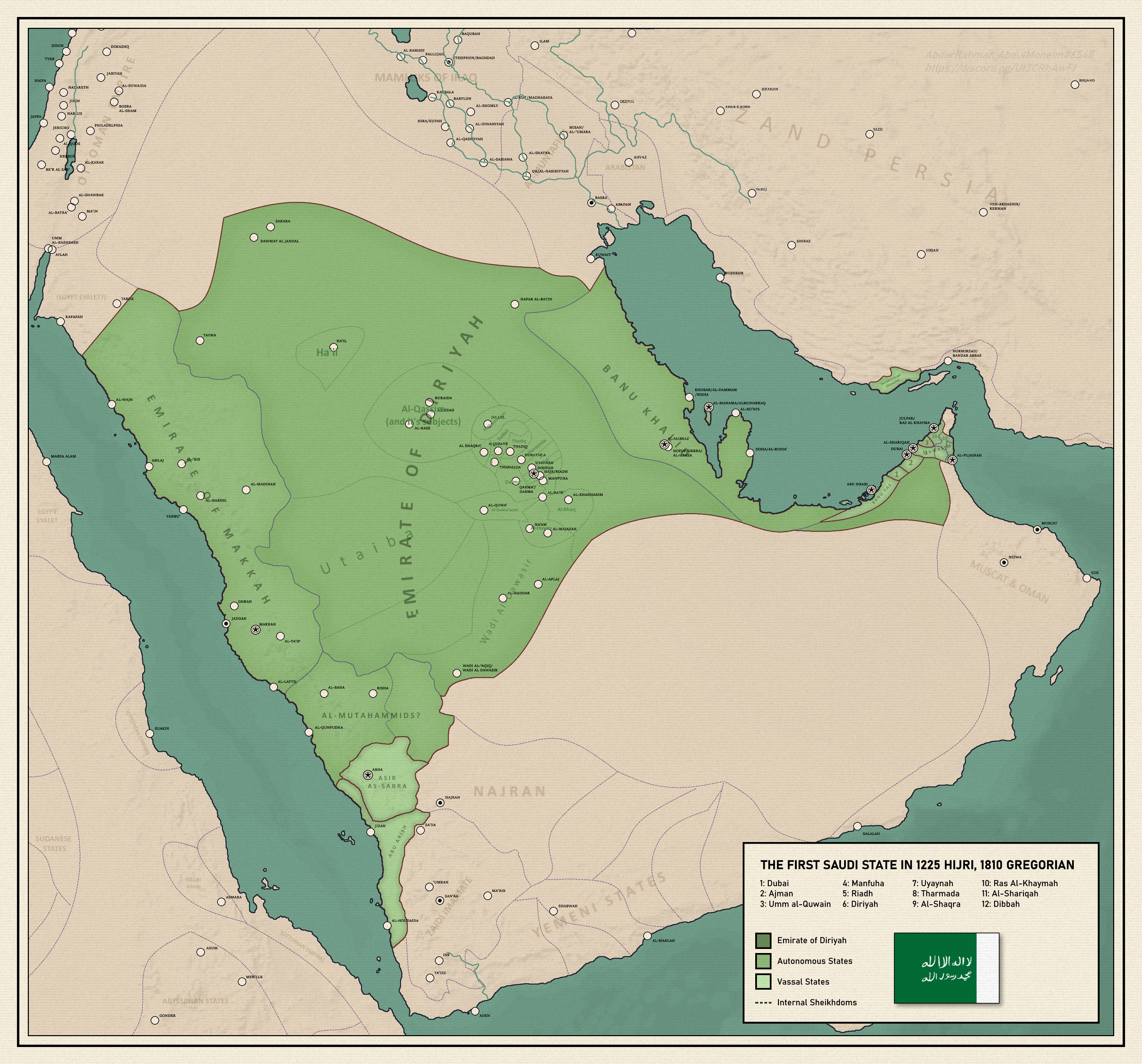
Expansion of the Emirate of Diriyah at its short-term peak around 1810

Ottoman control over these lands varied over the next four centuries with the fluctuating strength or weakness of the Empire's central authority. The emergence of what was to become the Saudi royal family, known as the Al Saud, began in Najd in central Arabia in 1744, when Muhammad bin Saud, founder of the dynasty, joined forces with the religious leader Muhammad ibn Abd al-Wahhab, founder of the Wahhabi movement, a strict puritanical form of Sunni Islam.

This alliance formed in the 18th century provided the ideological impetus to Saudi expansion and remains the basis of Saudi Arabian dynastic rule today. The first "Saudi state" established in 1744 in the area around Riyadh rapidly expanded and briefly controlled most of the present-day territory of Saudi Arabia, but was destroyed by 1818 by the Ottoman viceroy of Egypt, Mohammed Ali Pasha.

A much smaller second "Saudi state", located mainly in Nejd, was established in 1824 by Turki bn Abdullah. Throughout the rest of the 19th century, the Al Saud contested control of the interior of what was to become Saudi Arabia with another Arabian ruling family, the Al Rashid. By 1891, the Al Rashid were victorious and the Al Saud were driven into exile in Kuwait.

At the beginning of the 20th century, the Ottoman Empire continued to control or have suzerainty over most of the peninsula. Subject to this suzerainty, Arabia was ruled by a patchwork of tribal rulers, with the Sharif of Mecca having pre-eminence and ruling the Hejaz.

In 1902, Abdul Rahman's son, AbdulAziz—later to be known to the west as Ibn Saud—recaptured control of Riyadh, bringing the Al Saud back to Najd. Ibn Saud gained the support of the Ikhwan, a tribal army inspired by Wahhabism, and which had grown quickly after its foundation in 1912. With the aid of the Ikhwan, Ibn Saud captured al-Ahsa from the Ottomans in 1913.

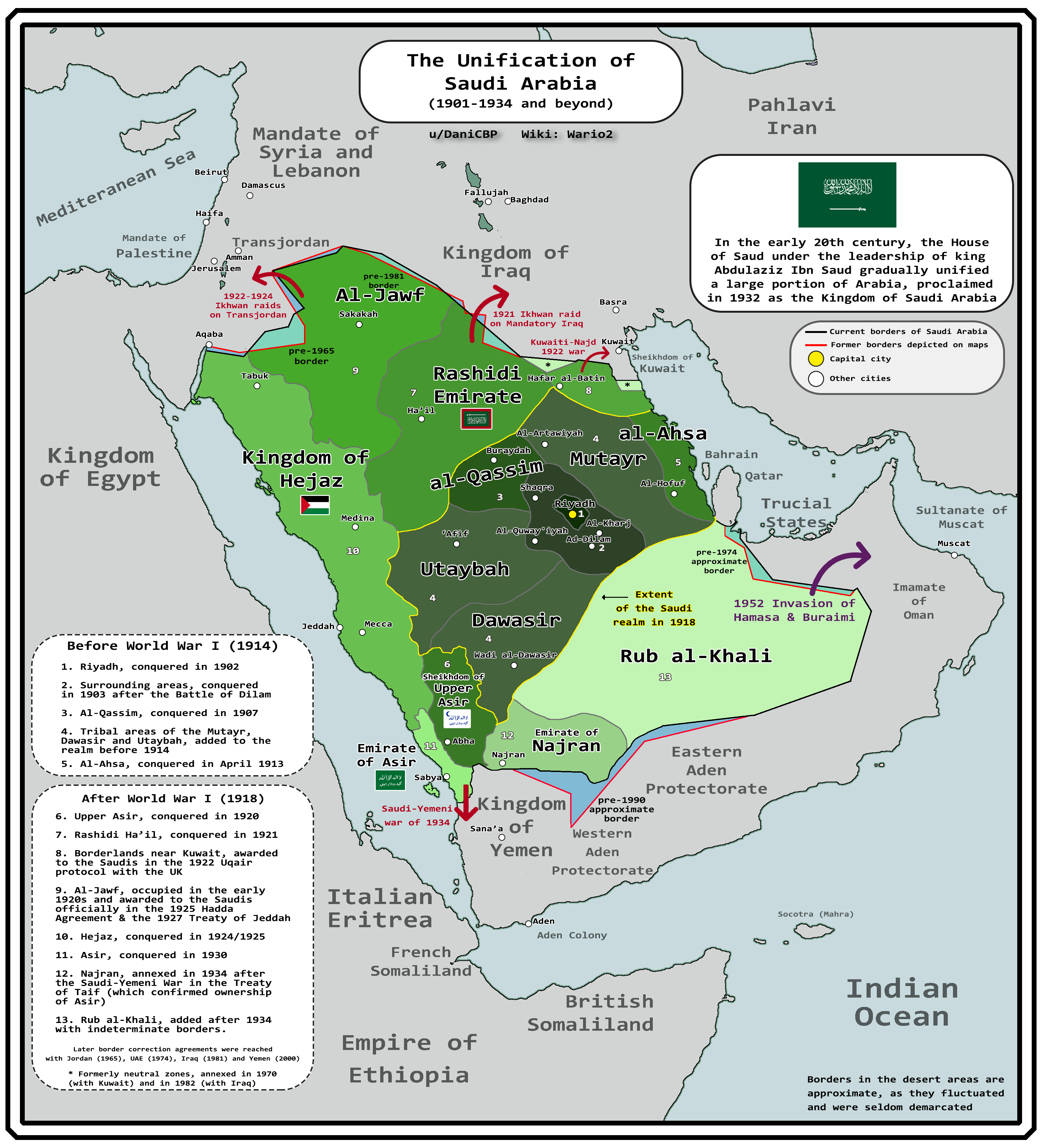
Territorial evolution of the Third Saudi state (1902–1934)

In 1916, with the encouragement and support of Britain (which was fighting the Ottomans in World War I), the Sharif of Mecca, Hussein bin Ali, led a pan-Arab revolt against the Ottoman Empire to create a united Arab state. Although this revolt failed in its objective, the Allied victory in World War I resulted in the end of Ottoman suzerainty and control in Arabia.

Ibn Saud avoided involvement in the Arab Revolt and instead continued his struggle with the Al Rashid. Following the latter's final defeat, he took the title Sultan of Najd in 1921. With the help of the Ikhwan, the Hejaz was conquered in 1924–25 and on 10 January 1926, Ibn Saud declared himself King of the Hejaz. A year later, he added the title of King of Nejd. For the next five years, he administered the two parts of his dual kingdom as separate units.

After the conquest of the Hejaz, the Ikhwan leadership turned to expansion of the Wahhabist realm into the British protectorates of Transjordan, Iraq and Kuwait, and began raiding those territories. This met with Ibn Saud's opposition, as he recognized the danger of a direct conflict with the British. At the same time, the Ikhwan became disenchanted with Ibn Saud's domestic policies, which appeared to favor modernization and the increase in the number of non-Muslim foreigners in the country. As a result, they turned against Ibn Saud and, after a two-year struggle, were defeated in 1930 at the Battle of Sabilla, where their leaders were massacred. In 1932 the two kingdoms of the Hejaz and Nejd were united as the modern-day Kingdom of Saudi Arabia.

== Geography ==
=== Boundaries ===
The exact boundaries of Najd cannot be precisely determined due to varying geographical and political limits throughout history. It is roughly bounded by the Hejaz region in the west, the Nafud desert in al-Jawf to the North, ad-Dahna Desert in al-Ahsa of Eastern Arabia to the east, and the Empty Quarter to the south.

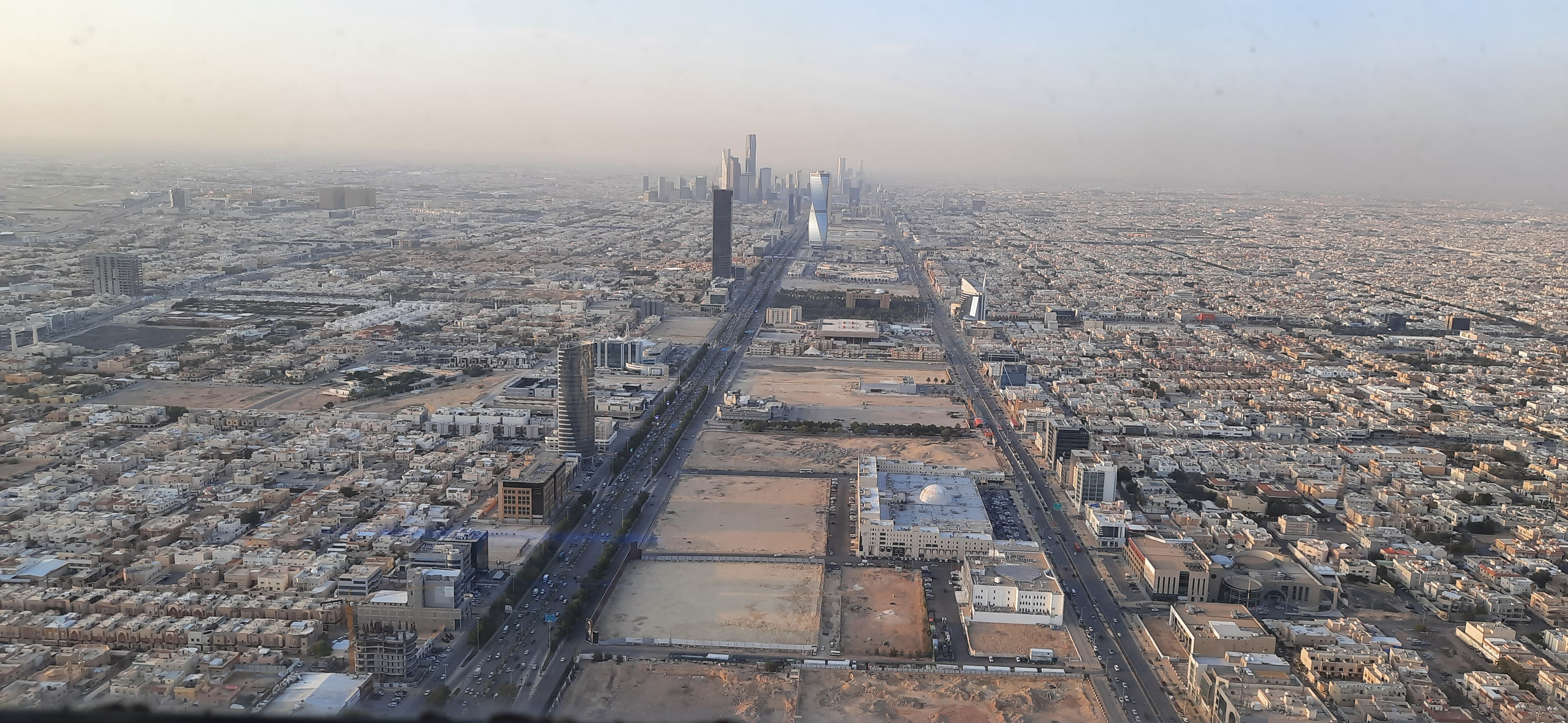
Riyadh is situated in the center of the Nafud desert, on the eastern part of the Najd plateau

Medieval Muslim geographers spent a great amount of time debating the exact boundaries between Hejaz and Najd in particular, but generally set the western boundaries of Najd to be wherever the western mountain ranges and lava beds began to slope eastwards, and set the eastern boundaries of Najd at the narrow strip of red sand dunes known as the Ad-Dahna Desert, some 100 km (62 mi) east of modern-day Riyadh. The southern border of Najd has always been set at the large sea of sand dunes known today as Rub' al Khali (the Empty Quarter), while the southwestern boundaries are marked by the valleys of Wadi Ranyah, Wadi Bisha, and Wadi Tathlith.

The northern boundaries of Najd have fluctuated greatly over time and received far less attention from the medieval geographers. In the early Islamic centuries, Najd was considered to extend as far north as the River Euphrates, or more specifically, the "Walls of Khosrau", constructed by the Sassanid Empire as a barrier between Arabia and Iraq immediately prior to the advent of Islam. The modern usage of the term encompasses the region of Al-Yamama, which was not always considered part of Najd historically, and became incorporated into the larger definition of Najd in the past centuries.

=== Topography ===
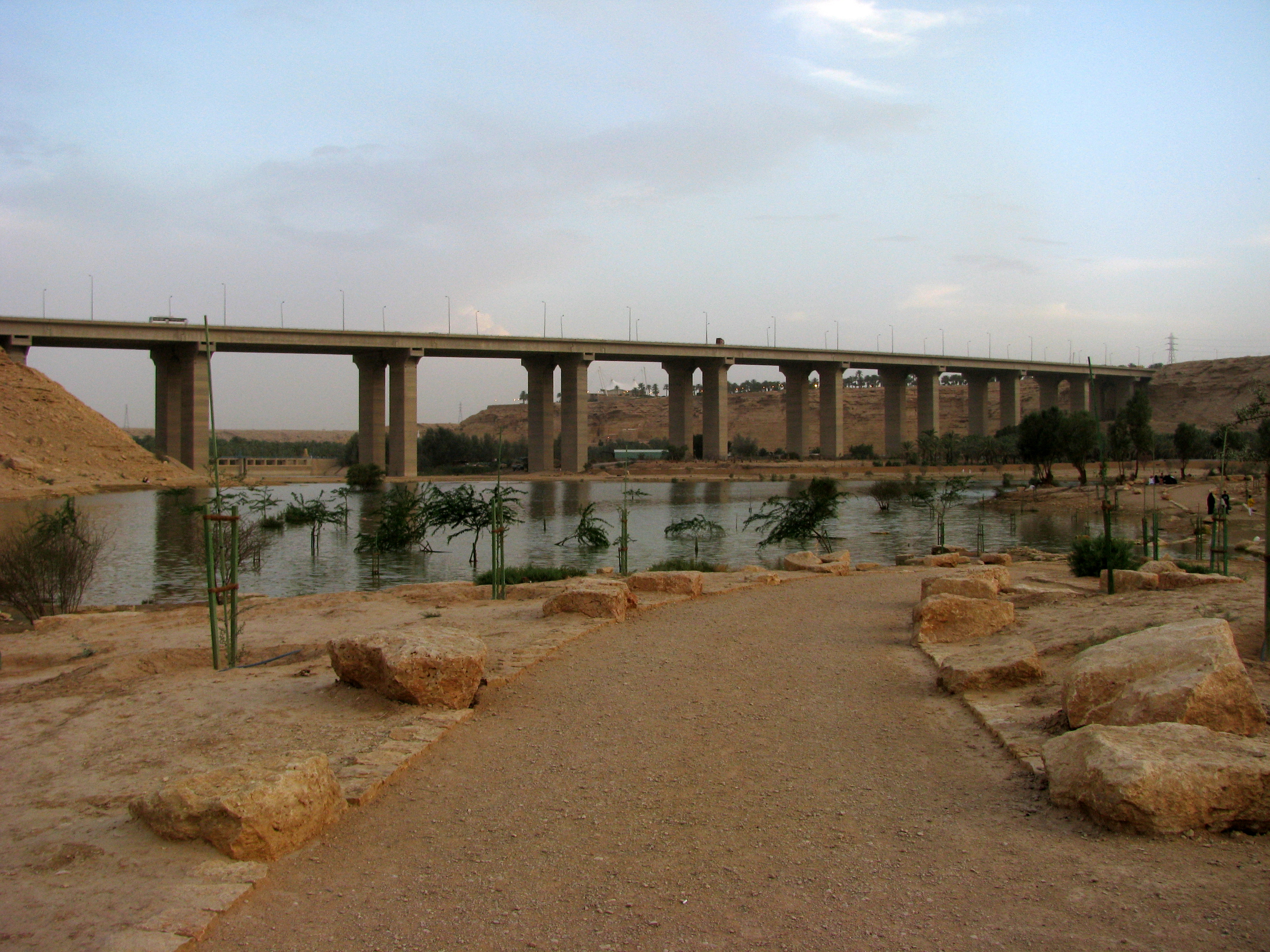
Lake at the 120 km long Wadi Hanifa valley that cuts through Riyadh

Najd is a plateau ranging from 762 to 1,525 m (2,500 to 5,003 ft) in height and sloping downwards from west to east. The eastern sections (historically better known as Al-Yamama) are marked by oasis settlements with much farming and trading activities, while the rest has traditionally been sparsely occupied by nomadic Bedouins. The main topographical features include the twin mountains of Aja and Salma in the north near Ha'il, the high land of Jabal Shammar and the Tuwaiq mountain range running through its center from north to south. Also important are the various dry river-beds (wadis) such as Wadi Hanifa near Riyadh, Wadi Na'am in the south, Wadi Al-Rumah in the Al-Qassim Province in the north, and Wadi ad-Dawasir at the southernmost tip of Najd on the border with Najran. Most Najdi villages and settlements are located along these wadis, due to ability of these wadis to preserve precious rainwater in the arid desert climate, while others are located near oases.

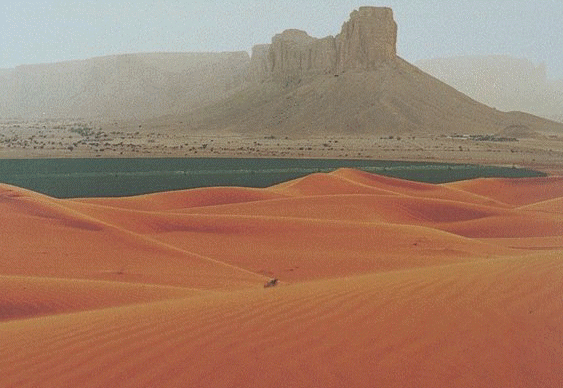
The An Nafud desert in the outskirts of Riyadh with the Jabal Tuwaiq in the background

Historically, Najd itself has been divided into small provinces made up of constellations of small towns, villages and settlements, with each one usually centered on one "capital". These subdivisions are still recognized by Najdis today, as each province retains its own variation of the Najdi dialect and Najdi customs. The most prominent among these provinces are Al-'Aridh, which includes Riyadh and the historical Saudi capital of Diriyah; Al-Qassim, with its capital in Buraidah; Sudair, centered on Al Majma'ah; Al-Washm, centered on Shaqra; and Jebel Shammar, with its capital, Ha'il. Under modern-day Saudi Arabia, however, Najd is divided into three administrative regions: Ha'il, Al-Qassim, and Riyadh, comprising a combined area of 554,000 km^{2} (214,000 sq mi).

== Culture ==
=== Architecture ===
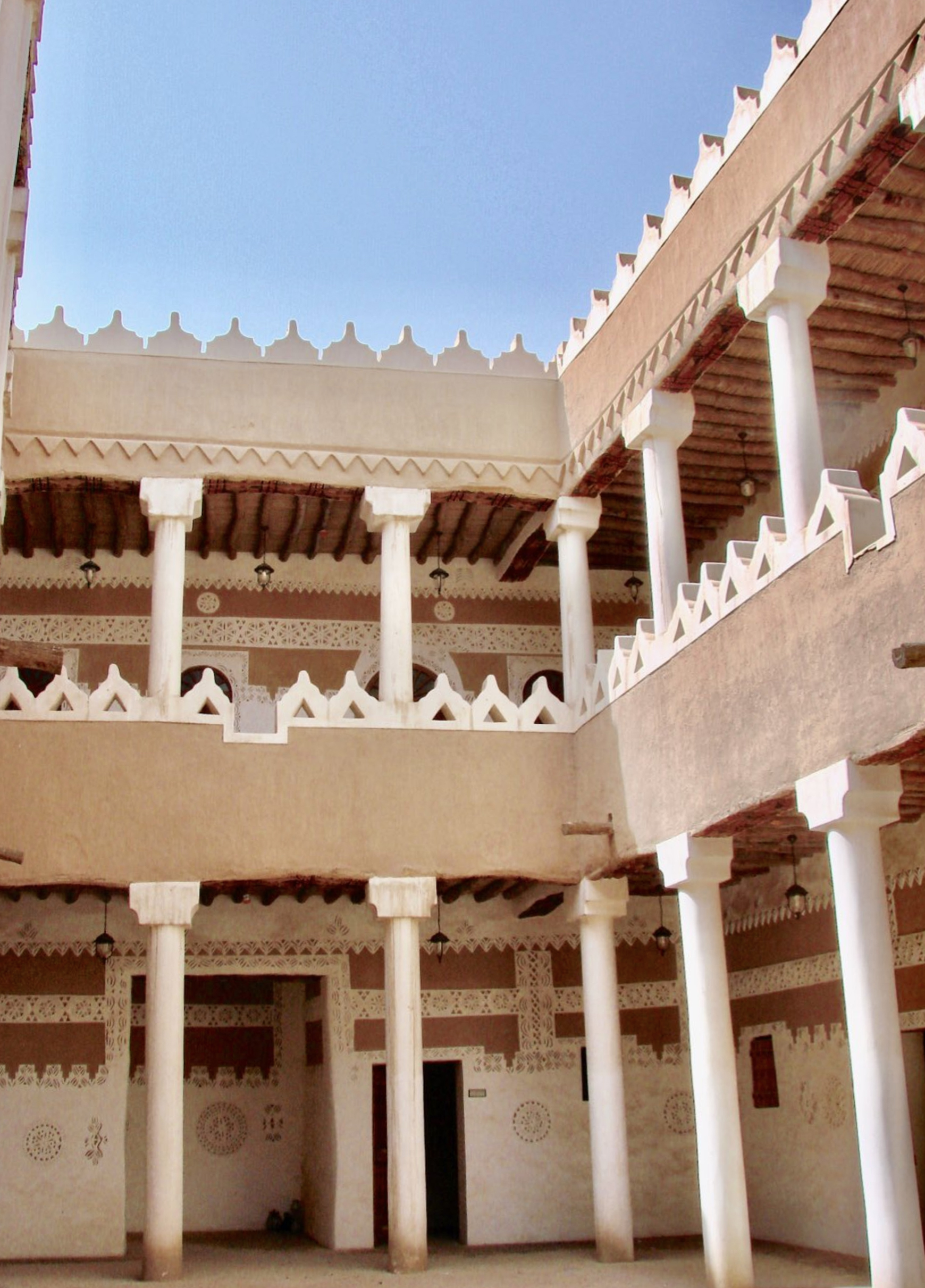
Battlements (shurfat) on the railings of Qaṣr al-Badi'a in Riyadh

The architecture of Najd is a type vernacular architecture. The style flourished roughly between 13th and 18th centuries and is known for its desert adaptive urban patterns with low-contour earth-structured mudbrick buildings that are characterized by elements such as triangular or rectangular openings (furjat) and battlements (shurfat) as well as peepholes projecting outward from the main façade (tarma). The presence of a central courtyard and open spaces also forms a distinct part of the architectural style. The influence of Najdi style can be felt in neighboring regions, such as Kuwait and inland Qatar.

== Demographics ==
=== Social and ethnic groups ===
Unlike the Hejaz and Tihamah, Najd is remote and stayed outside of the realm of important Islamic empires such as the Abbasids and the Ottoman Empire. This historical separation largely shaped its current dissimilarity to Hejaz.

=== Religion ===
The region is traditionally known as a Hanbali stronghold, and after the 18th century became known for its strict interpretation of Islam and is generally considered a bastion of religious conservatism. The founder of the interpretation of Salafism, Muhammad ibn Abd al-Wahhab, was born in 'Uyayna, a village in the Najd.

The majority of people in the region consider themselves as Salafi Muslims. The name derives from advocating a return to the traditions of the "ancestors" (salaf), the first three generations of Muslims said to know the "purest" form of Islam. Those generations include the Islamic prophet Muhammad and his companions (the Sahabah), their successors (the Tabi‘un), and the successors of the successors (the Taba al-Tabi‘in). Practically, Salafis maintain that Muslims ought to rely on the Qur'an, the Sunnah and the 'Ijma (consensus) of the salaf, giving them precedence over later Islamic hermeneutic teachings.

==== In the Hadith ====
According to two narrations in Sahih Bukhari, Prophet Muhammad asks Allah to bless the areas of Bilad al-Sham (Syria) and Yemen. When his companions said "Our Najd as well," he replied: There will appear earthquakes and afflictions, and from there will come out the side of the head (i.e. horns) of Satan. In a similar narration, Muhammad again asked Allah to bless the areas Medina, Mecca, Sham, and Yemen and, when asked specifically to bless Najd, repeated similar comments about there being earthquakes, trials, tribulations, and the horns of Satan.

"O Allaah bestow your blessings on our Shaam. O Allaah bestow your blessings on our Yemen." The people said, "O Messenger of Allaah, and our Najd." I think the third time the Prophet, sallallaahu alayhi wa sallam, said, "There (in Najd) will occur earthquakes, trials and tribulations, and from there appears the Horn of Satan."

The according to the Islamic scholar and Grand mufti of Saudi Arabia, Ibn Baz, the hadith is Sahih (correct).

== Language ==
The people of Najd have spoken Arabic, in one form or another, for practically all of recorded history. As in other regions of the peninsula, there is a divergence between the dialect of the nomadic Bedouins and the dialect of the sedentary townspeople. The variation, however, is far less pronounced in Najd than it is elsewhere in the country, and the Najdi sedentary dialect may be either descended from the Bedouin dialect, or due to similar conditions of isolation from foreign influence, they share similar isolated features being related dialects. The Najdi dialect is seen by some to be the least foreign-influenced of all modern Arabic dialects, due to the isolated location and harsh climate of the Najdi plateau, as well as the apparent absence of any substratum from a previous language. Indeed, not even the ancient South Arabian language appears to have been widely spoken in Najd in ancient times, unlike southern Saudi Arabia, for example.

Within Najd itself, the different regions and towns have their own distinctive accents and sub-dialects. However, these have largely merged in recent times and have become heavily influenced by Arabic dialects from other regions and countries. This is particularly the case in Riyadh.

== Economy ==
In the early 20th century, Najd produced coarse wool cloth, dates and a wide range of other agricultural products.

== In popular culture ==
A contest held in the Middle East brought light to a new character in famed SNK Playmore video game, The King of Fighters XIV. This character goes under the name Najd.

== See also ==
- Hadhramaut
- Greater Yemen
- Eastern Arabia
- Kingdom of Hijaz and Najd
- Expedition to Najd (1817–1818)
- Al-Dukhul and Hummel Mountains
