= State visit by Charles III to Kenya =

2023 visit by the British monarch

King Charles III in 2023

King Charles III of the United Kingdom of Great Britain and Northern Ireland and his wife Queen Camilla made a state visit to Kenya from 31 October to 3 November 2023, hosted by the President of Kenya William Ruto and his wife, Rachel. The visit marked Charles's first visit to a Commonwealth country since becoming head of the Commonwealth.

== Background ==
Kenya, a former British colony, marked the 60th anniversary of its independence in 2023. Charles's mother, Queen Elizabeth II, was in Kenya at the time of her accession in 1952 following the death of her father King George VI. Charles's visit occurred amidst calls for an official apology over Britain's colonial past.

The visit was preceded by a reception hosted by King Charles III and Queen Camilla at Buckingham Palace on October 24 to mark the 60th anniversary of Kenya's independence from the United Kingdom.

== Visit ==
Charles and Camilla arrived in Nairobi on the night of 30 October. Their royal artist for the trip was Phillip Butah.

=== 31 October ===
Charles and Camilla were greeted upon arrival at the State House, the official residence of the President, by President Ruto and the First Lady. Accompanied by the Queen, the King then toured Uhuru Gardens National Monument and Museum and laid a wreath. The royal couple also went to the Eastlands local library and met young students.

In the evening, the Rutos hosted King Charles and Queen Camilla for a state banquet. In his speech, the King referred to Britain's colonial actions as "abhorrent and unjustifiable acts of violence" and as a "cause of the greatest sorrow and the deepest regret", but he did not formally apologise.

=== 1 November ===
Charles and Camilla walked through the Tunnel of Martyrs, which included visuals of those who had died in Kenya's struggle for independence. They also met with Kenyan veterans who had fought for the British in World War II. King Charles also held a meeting with the family of Dedan Kimathi, a rebel leader who was hanged by the colonial British authorities. Later, the King and Queen visited the Ivory Burning Site in Nairobi National Park.

=== 2 November ===
The King visited Mombasa on the penultimate day of the state visit. Joined by Queen Camilla, Charles observed a drill by the Kenyan Marines, meeting with marines and their families thereafter. The King and Queen attended a military ceremony with President Ruto at Mtwonge Naval Base, where Charles also reviewed an honour guard. The King also visited a turtle conservation site and a coral restoration project.

=== 3 November ===
On the final date of the state visit, King Charles met with religious leaders and toured Mandhry Mosque. Queen Camilla met with survivors of gender-based and sexual violence. Later in the day, Charles and Camilla visited Fort Jesus and met with local artists. The King and Queen also observed a ceremonial dance by a costal Mijikenda community, and were photographed on a tuktuk. They were seen off by President Ruto as they departed Moi International Airport at the end of the visit.

== See also ==
- List of official overseas trips made by Charles III
- State visit by Charles III to France
- Kenya–United Kingdom relations
