= Ibn al-Jarrah =

Ibn al-Jarrāḥ may refer to:

- Abu Ubayda ibn al-Jarrah (583–639), Muslim commander and companion of Muhammad
- Waki' ibn al-Jarrah (745/47–812), hadith scholar
- Ali ibn Isa ibn al-Jarrah (859–946), Persian official of the Abbasid Caliphate
- Mufarrij ibn Daghfal ibn al-Jarrah (fl. c. 977–1013), Jarrahid emir and rebel against the Fatimid Caliphate
