= Ad-Dahna Desert =

Desert in Saudi Arabia

Coordinates: 24°06′N 45°26′E

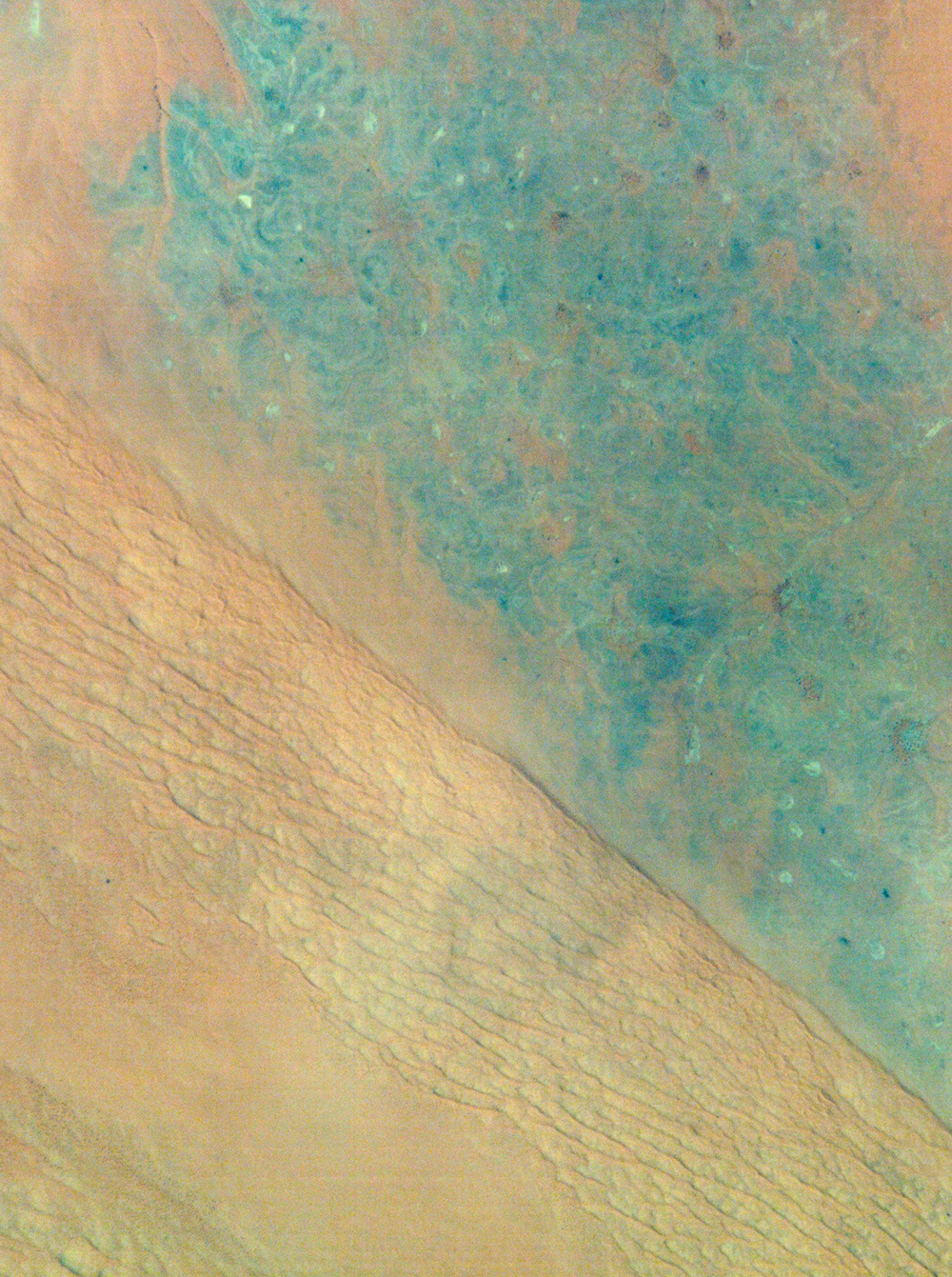
Satellite view of Al-Dahna desert

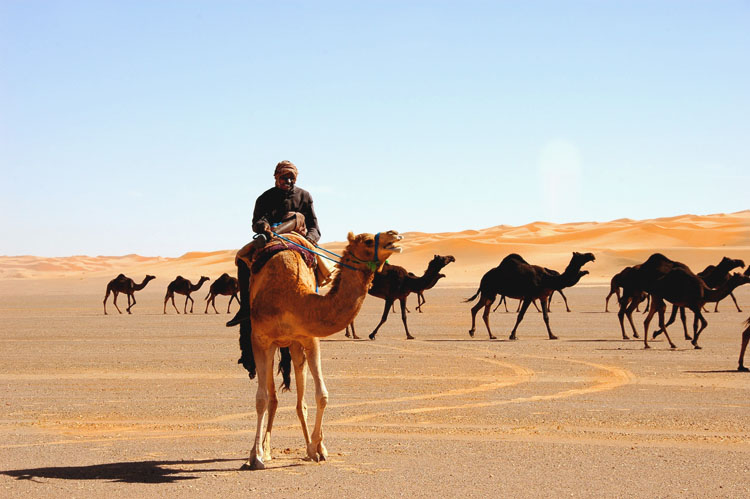
A caravan in Ad-Dahnā'

Ad-Dahna Desert is the central division of the Arabian Desert. It is a corridor of sandy terrain forming a bow-like shape that connects an-Nafud desert in the north to Rub' al-Khali desert in the south. Its length is more than 1,000 km (620 miles) bordering Twaik Mountains from the east and does not exceed 80 km (50 miles) in width. It is also considered the geographical margin separating Al-Ahsa Province of Saudi Arabia from the country's Najd region. Al-Dahna Desert is therefore the string that connects the great deserts of Saudi Arabia.

The desert is a series of seven successive deserts, separated from one another by plains. Roads pass through Al-Dahnā, linking Kuwait with Al-Zilfī and Riyadh and connecting Riyadh with Hasa.

Ad-Dahna desert is formed of high sand dunes spreading horizontally which are called ergs (Arabic: عِرْق, romanized: ʿirq), mostly red in color since it contains Iron Oxides.

== Caves ==
Beneath the harsh deserts of Saudi Arabia lie dark chambers and complex mazes filled with crystalline structures, stalactites and stalagmites. The limestone floor of the Summan plateau, a karst area to the east of the ad-Dahna desert, is riddled with such caves, known locally as Dahls. Some have tiny entrances which open into caves, others lead into a maze of passages which can be several kilometers long. Local Bedouin have always known these caves and some were used as water supplies. They were first systematically studied in the 1981, and later explored and reported by the Saudi Geological Survey.

== See also ==
- Rub' al Khali
- Arabian Desert
- Ancient towns in Saudi Arabia
