= Al-Magar =

Prehistoric Arabian culture

Al-Magar culture
- Map showing location of Al Magar site in Saudi Arabia
- 19.744213°N 44.620447°E
- Type: Ancient
- Periods: Neolithic
- Location: In the southwestern central part of Saudi Arabia
- Region: Najd
- Part of: Central Arabia

History
- Built: c. 9000 BC
- Abandoned: c. 7000 BC

Al-Magar was an advanced Neolithic culture of Prehistoric Arabia, whose epicenter lay in modern-day southwestern Najd in Saudi Arabia. Al-Magar is possibly one of the first cultures in the world where widespread domestication of animals occurred, particularly the horse, during the Neolithic period.

== Overview ==
The inhabitants of Al-Magar, who lived in stone houses built with dry masonry, were one of the first communities in the world to practice the art of agriculture and animal husbandry before climate changes in the region resulted in desertification.

Discoveries such as that of a large statue of a bridled horse indicates that the domestication of horses occurred about 9000 years ago in the Arabian peninsula, much earlier than in other parts of the world where domestication of the horse is thought to have occurred. Radiocarbon dating of several objects discovered at Al-Magar indicate an age of about 9,000 years.

In November 2017 hunting scenes showing images of what appears to be domesticated dogs resembling the Canaan dog and wearing leashes were discovered in Shuwaymis, an area about 370 km southwest of the city of Ḥaʼil. Dated at 8000 years before present, these are thought of as the earliest known depictions of dogs in the world.

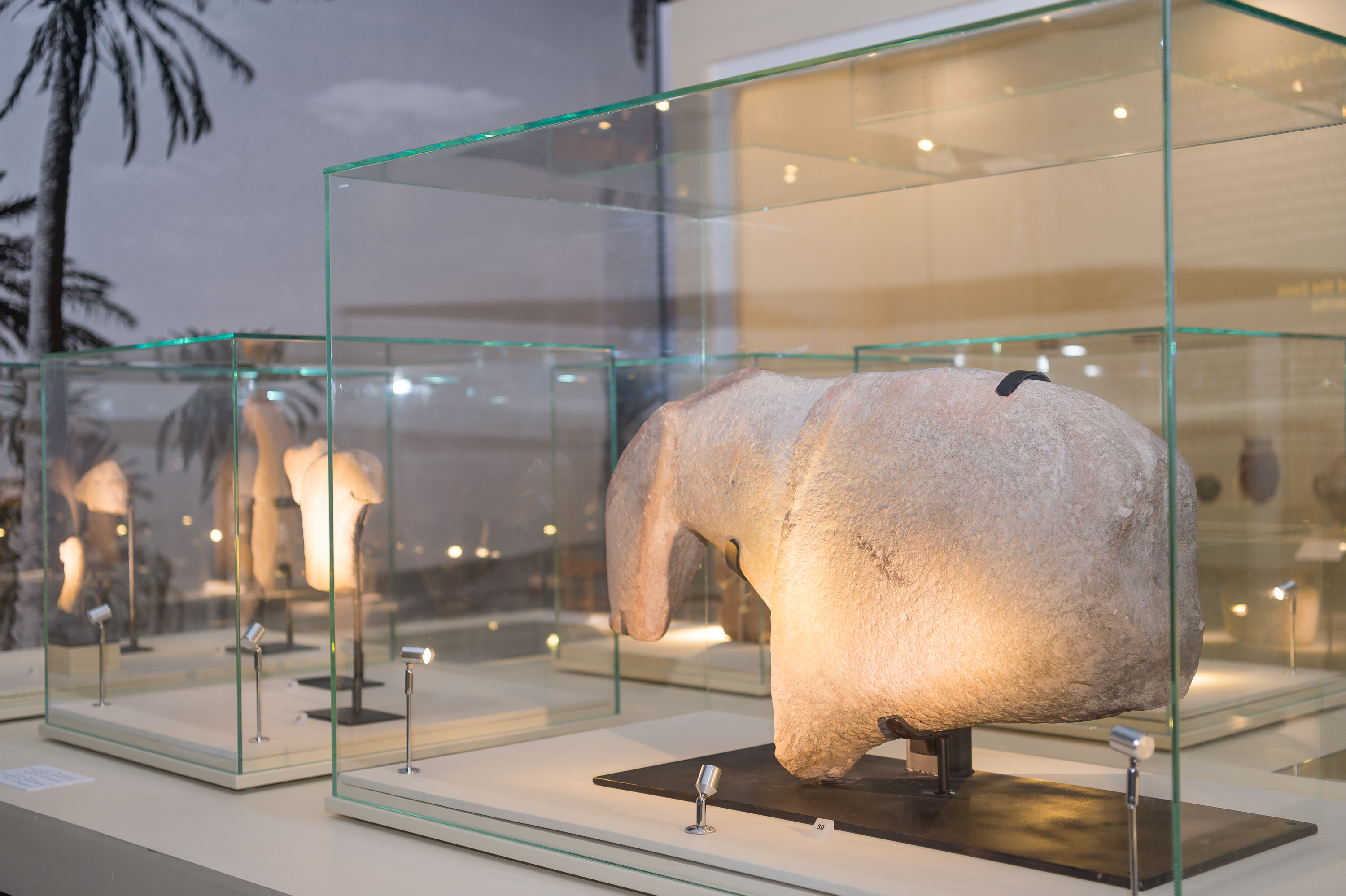
A large stone carving of an equidae - an animal belonging to the horse family. The piece itself, measuring 86 cms long by 18 cms thick and weighing more than 135kg., is a large sculptural fragment that appears to show the head, muzzle, shoulder and withers of a horse. The fact that other smaller, horse-like sculptures were found at Al-Magar, with similar bands over the shoulders, supports the idea that this culture may have been using horse tack to domesticate horses.

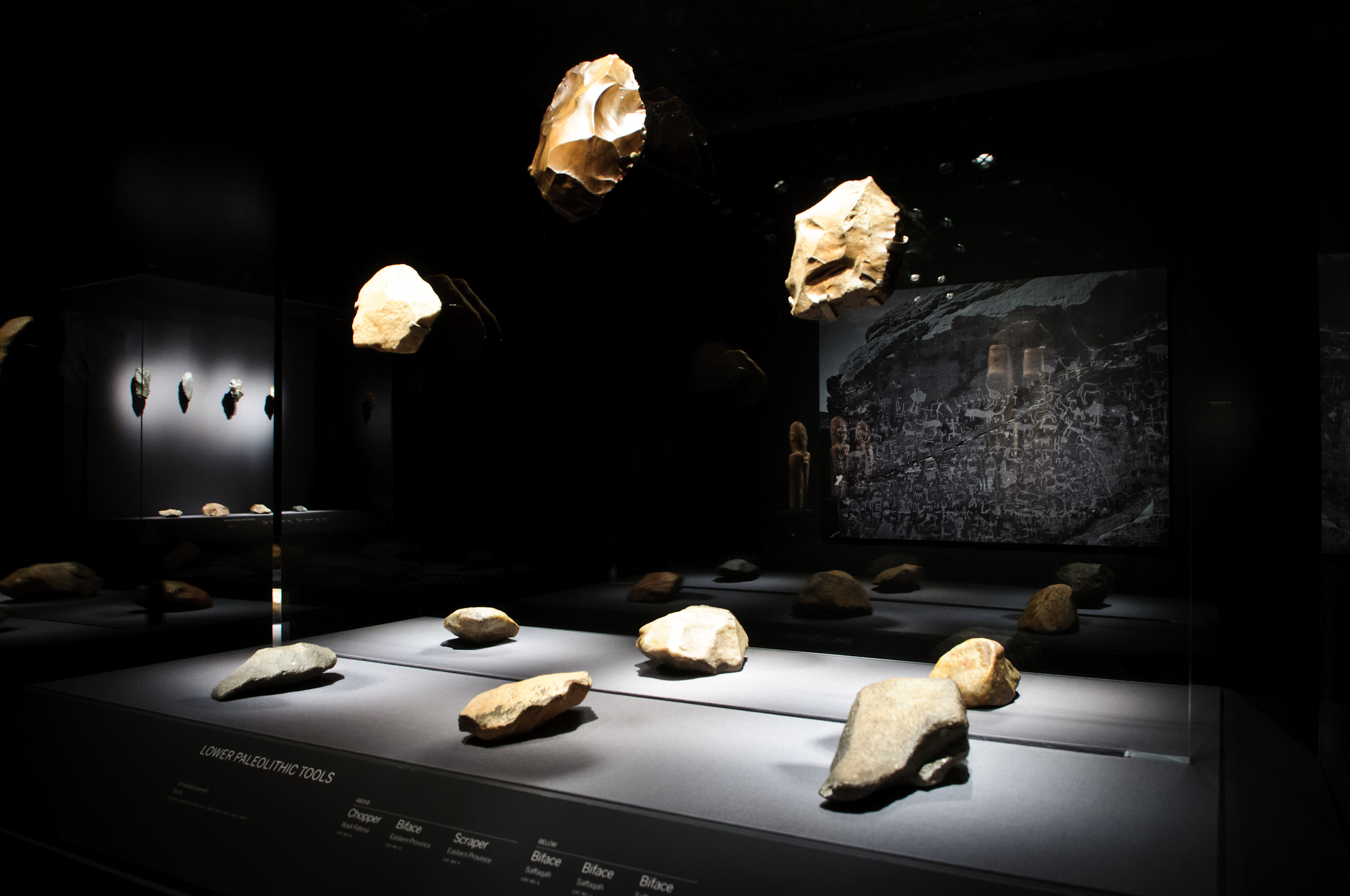
Stone scrapers dating back to 8100 BC.

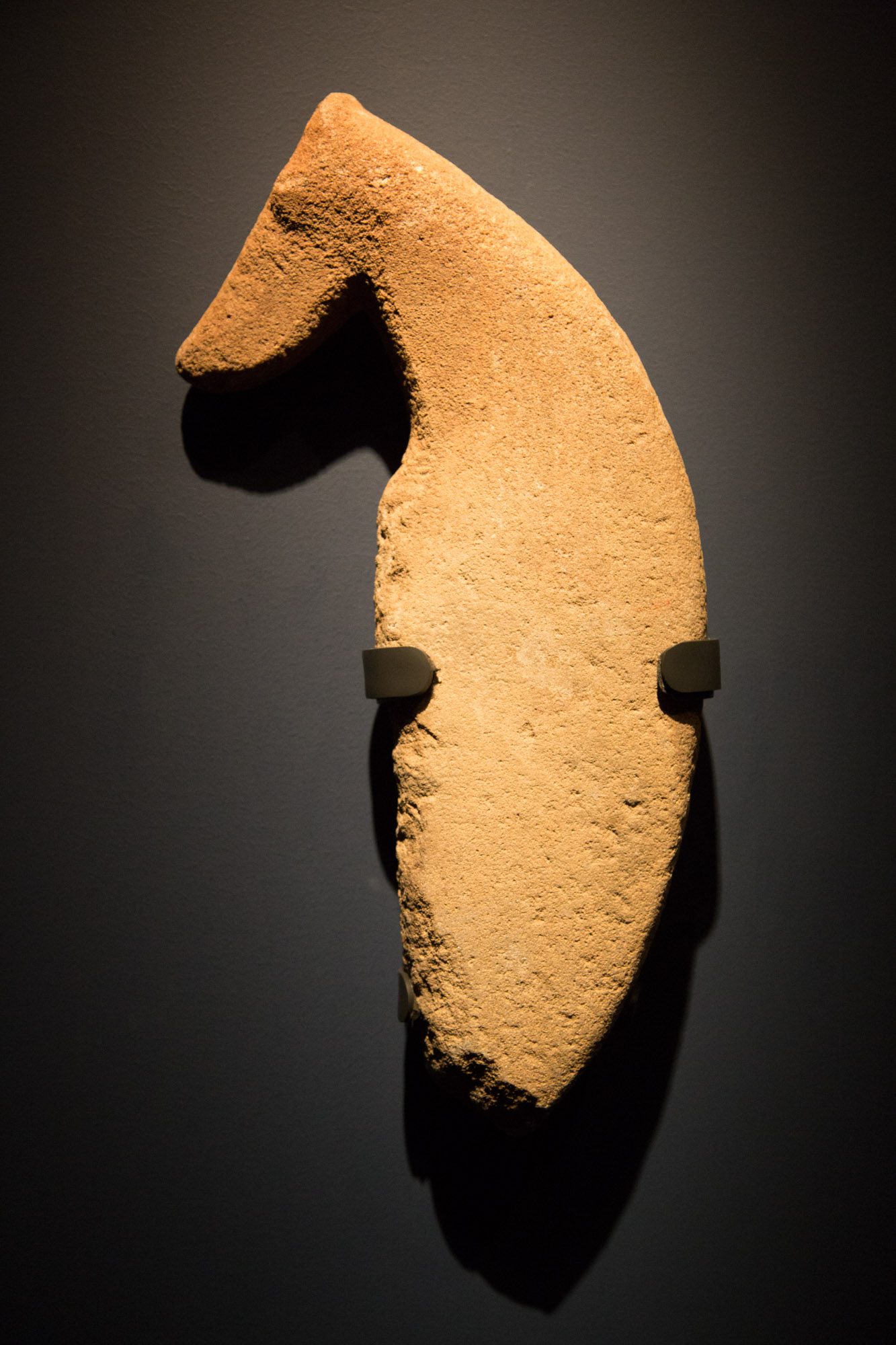
A stone sculpture of a dog that resembles the ancient native Saluki breed, dating back to 8100 BC.
