= Expedition of Qatan =

Battle in what is now Saudi Arabia

Raid on Banu Asad bin Khuzaymah tribe
Date	625 AD, 4 AH, Muharram
Location	Nejd, Qatan, Saudi Arabia
Result	Muslim victory; Tribe members flee; Muslims bring back booty

Belligerents
Muslims	Banu Asad

Commanders and leaders
Abu Salama 'Abd Allah ibn 'Abd al-Asad †	Tulayha

Strength
150	Unknown

Casualties and losses
1 (Abu Salama)	3 prisoners

The Expedition of Qatan, was the first Raid on the Banu Asad bin Khuzaymah tribe, which occurred directly after the Battle of Hamra al-Asad in the year 4 A.H of the Islamic calendar.

== Background ==
Banu Asad ibn Khuzaymah tribe (not to be confused with the Banu Asad tribe) were the residents of Qatan, in the vicinity of Fayd. They were a powerful tribe connected with the Quraysh. They resided near the hill of Qatan in Nejd, the site of one of the many of Muhammad's ghazwa in order to spread Islam. So he dispatched a force of 150 men under the leadership of Abu Salama `Abd Allah ibn `Abd al-Asad to make a sudden attack on this tribe on the first day of Muharram.

== Raid ==
When the Muslims arrived at the site, the tribe members fled and the Muslims found three herdsmen with a large herd of camels and goats. Then the booty, along with the three captives, was brought to Medina.

On the rule on Ghanimah (plunder), the Dictionary of Islam writes, "If the Imam, or the leader of the Muslim army, conquers a country by force of arms, he is at liberty to leave the land in possession of the original proprietors, provided they pay tribute, or he may divide it amongst the Muslims; but with regard to movable property, it is unlawful for him to leave it in possession of the infidels, but he must bring it away with the army and divide it amongst the soldiers". Being movable objects, the goats were therefore taken back to Medina.

Abu Salamah had an inflammation from a previous wound, and he died.

The 2nd raid of the Banu Asad ibn Khuzaymah tribe took place almost 3 years later.

== Islamic sources ==
=== Biographical literature ===
This event is mentioned in Ibn Sa’d's biography of Muhammad. The Muslim jurist Ibn Qayyim Al-Jawziyya also mentions the event in his biography of Muhammad, Zad al-Ma'ad. Modern secondary sources which mention this, include the award-winning book, Ar-Raheeq Al-Makhtum (The Sealed Nectar)

=== Hadith literature ===
Sahih Muslim, 19:4330, Sahih al-Bukhari, 5:59:627, Sahih Muslim, 19:4331 and Sahih Muslim, 19:4332 all mention that Muhammad sent some Muslims on a Military expedition to Nejd. This is where the raid took place.

Sahih Muslim, 19:4332 states:

It has been narrated by Ibn 'Umar that the Messenger of Allah (may peace be upon him) sent an expedition to Najd, and I (also) went with the troops. We got camels and goats as spoils of war, and our share amounted to twelve camels per head, and the Messenger of Allah (may peace be upon him) gave an extra camel to each of us. Sahih Muslim, 19:4332

== See also ==
- Military career of Muhammad
- List of expeditions of Muhammad
- Muslim–Quraysh War

== Notes ==
- Mubarakpuri, Saifur Rahman Al (2005), The sealed nectar: biography of the Noble Prophet, Darussalam Publications, ISBN 978-9960-899-55-8
