= Waki' ibn al-Jarrah =

Islamic hadith scholar (745/47–812)

Personal life
- Born: 745–747 Kufa, Umayyad Caliphate
- Died: 812 (aged 65–66) Fayd, Abbasid Caliphate
- Children: Sufyan ibn Waki'
- Main interest: Hadith
- Notable work(s): al-Sunan, al-Marifa Wa al-Tarikh, al-Zuhd

Religious life
- Religion: Islam
- Denomination: Sunni
- Jurisprudence: Hanafi

Abū Sufyān Wakīʿ ibn al-Jarrāḥ ibn Malīḥ al-Ruʾāsī al-Kilābī al-Kufī (Arabic: أبو سفيان وكيع بن الجراح بن مليح الرؤاسي الكلابي الكوفي; 745/47–812) was a prominent hadith scholar based in Kufa. He was one of the principal teachers of the major Sunni Muslim jurist Ahmad ibn Hanbal and part of the tābiʿ al-tābiʿīn.

== Origins ==
Waki was born in Kufa, or in the village of Ustuwa near Nishapur, in 128/129 AH (745–747 CE). His father al-Jarrah ibn Malih belonged to the Ubayd ibn Ru'as clan of the Banu Kilab tribe and was born in Soghdia, while his mother, a daughter of Amra ibn Shaddad ibn Thawr of the same clan, was born in Bukhara; the Ubayd ibn Ru'as had been settled in Kufa following the Muslim conquest of Iraq in the 630s. The family was well off and al-Jarrah was the supervisor of the bayt al-darb (mint) at Rayy, before being appointed head of the bayt al-mal (treasury) in Baghdad under the Abbasid caliph Harun al-Rashid (r. 786–809).

== Career ==
Schooled in the Islamic religious sciences, especially the hadith (traditions attributed to the Islamic prophet Muhammad), Waki became a leading traditionist (muhaddith) in his hometown, known for transmitting numerous hadiths based on his memorizations. Despite the errors of transmission attributed to him, Waki was generally regarded as the best muhaddith of his time. His refusal of an appointment as qadi (head judge) by Harun al-Rashid out of concern of dependence on the state further contributed to his reputation for piety and ascetism.

Ibn Hajar al-Asqalani has mentioned a long list of his teachers and students in his work Tahdhib al-tahdhib. He transmitted hadiths on the authority of the earlier Muslim scholars Isma'il ibn Abi Khalid, Ikrima ibn Ammar, al-Awza'i, al-A'mash, and Malik ibn Anas, as well as his father. Al-Dhahabi in his Siyar a`lam al-nubala has listed the names of about 20 teachers of Waki out of which the best known were Sufyan al-Thawri, Shu'ba ibn al-Ḥajjāj and Ibn Jurayj. He was among the most important teachers of Ahmad ibn Hanbal, founder and namesake of the Hanbali school of Sunni Muslim jurisprudence (fiqh). Waki himself was classified as a follower of the Hanafi fiqh of Sunni Islam.

Waki built a mosque in Kufa, installing as its imam a tribesman of his, Humayd ibn Abd al-Rahman ibn Humayd al-Ru'asi.

== Death and descendants ==
On his return from the Hajj (pilgrimage to Mecca), Waki died in the Fayd oasis in 197 AH (812). His son Sufyan was also a Kufan traditionist, though of poor reputation. Sufyan died at an old age in 861.

== Literary works ==
Although Waki was popularly held to have never possessed a book, he authored a number of works:

- Tafsir al-Quran
- al-Sunan
- al-Marifa Wa al-Tarikh
- al-Musannaf (cited by Ahmad ibn Hanbal and Ibn Hajar al-Asqalani)
- al-Zuhd (a copy of which is preserved in the al-Zahiriyah Library Library of Damascus)
- Kitab al-salat, of which just one page survived on a papyrus leaf

== Bibliography ==
- Blankinship, Khalid Yahya, ed. (1993). The History of al-Ṭabarī, Volume XI: The Challenge to the Empires. SUNY Series in Near Eastern Studies. Albany, New York: State University of New York Press. ISBN 978-0-7914-0851-3.
- Caskel, Werner (1966). Ğamharat an-nasab: Das genealogische Werk des His̆ām ibn Muḥammad al-Kalbī, Volume II (in German). Leiden: Brill.
- Hurvitz, Nimrod (2002). The Formation of Hanbalism: Piety into Power. New York: Routledge. ISBN 0-7007-1507-X.
- Khoury, R. G. (2002). "Wakīʿ b. al-Djarrāḥ b Malīḥ". In Bearman, P. J.; Bianquis, Th.; Bosworth, C. E.; van Donzel, E. & Heinrichs, W. P. (eds.). The Encyclopaedia of Islam, Second Edition. Volume XI: W–Z. Leiden: E. J. Brill. p. 101. ISBN 978-90-04-12756-2.
- Rosenthal, Franz, ed. (1989). The History of al-Ṭabarī, Volume I: General Introduction and from the Creation to the Flood. SUNY Series in Near Eastern Studies. Albany, New York: State University of New York Press. ISBN 978-0-88706-562-0.
- Salem, Feryal (2016). The Emergence of Early Sufi Piety and Sunnī Scholasticism: ʿAbdallāh b. al-Mubarak and the Formation of Sunni Identity in the Second Islamic Century. Leiden and Boston: Brill. ISBN 978-90-04-31029-2.
- Spectorsky, Susan A. (2013). "Ahmad b. Hanbal (d. 243/855)". In Powers, David S.; Spectorsky, Susan A.; Arabi, Oussama (eds.). Islamic Legal Thought: A Compendium of Muslim Jurists. Leiden and Boston: Brill. pp. 85–106. ISBN 978-90-04-25452-7.
- Szilagyi, K. (2009). "A Prophet like Jesus? Christians and Muslims Debating Muhammad's Death". Jerusalem Studies in Arabic and Islam. 36.
