= Mandhry Mosque =

Mosque in Mombasa, Kenya

Coordinates: 4°03′37″S 39°40′46″E

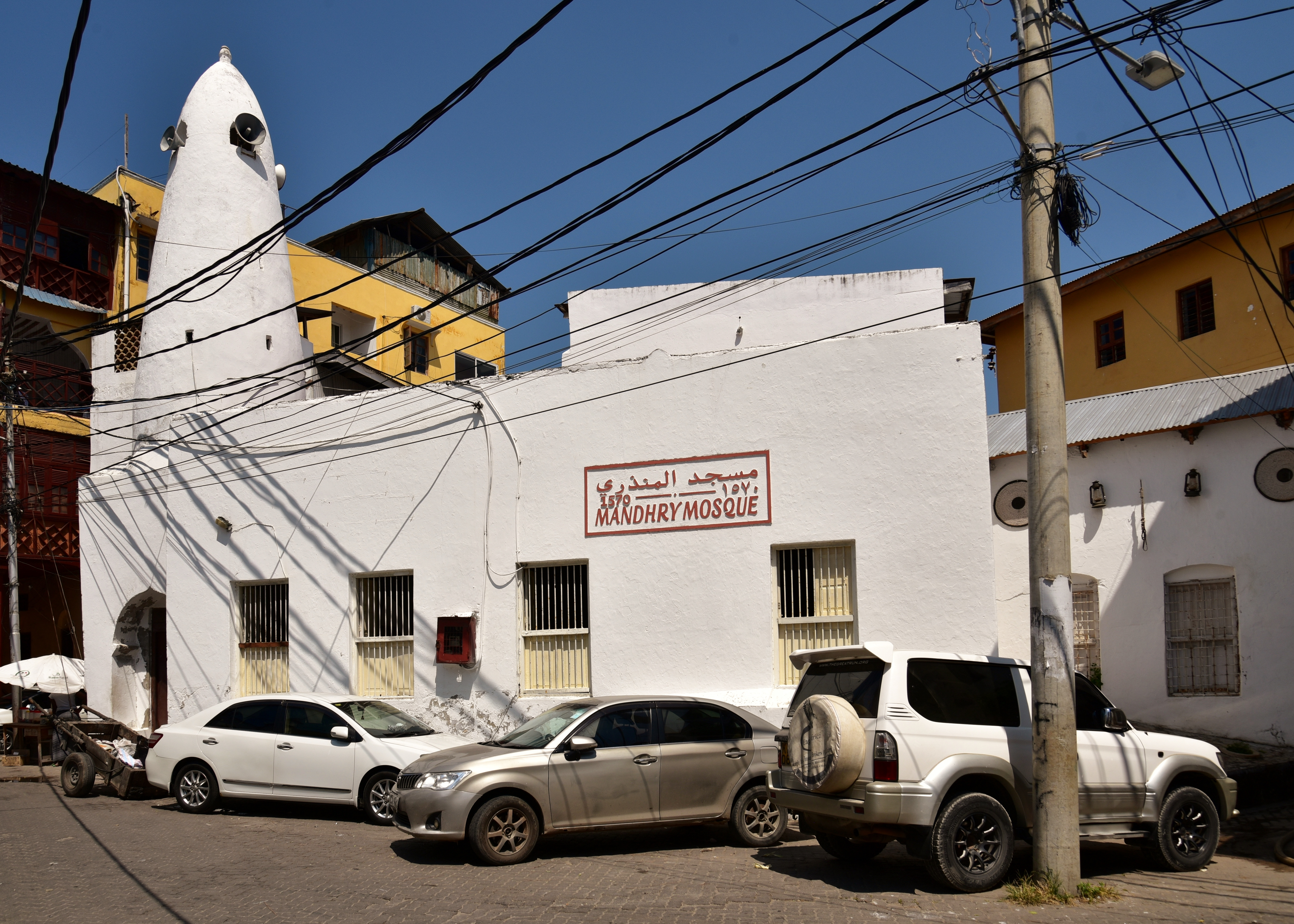

Religion
- Affiliation: Islam
- Region: Coast Province

Location
- Location: Sir Mbarak Street, Old Town, Mombasa, Kenya
- Municipality: Mombasa
- Country: Kenya
- Interactive map of Mandhry Mosque

Architecture
- Type: Mosque
- Style: Swahili
- Founder: Omani settlers / Mandhry clan
- Established: 1570 (977-978 AH)

Specifications
- Capacity: Originally ~10, later expanded
- Minaret: 1
- Materials: Coral stone, coral mortar (chokaa)

Mandhry Mosque is a mosque in the old town of Mombasa. It is the oldest mosque in Mombasa, and the second-oldest in Kenya.

It was built by Omani settlers in 1570 (977-978 AH), and has continually been kept by the Mandhry clan of Mombasa for centuries.

It is built in the Swahili architectural style, with a rounded minaret, and is one of only two mosques in the world with two mihrabs.

== History ==
The mosque was originally built in 1570 by Omani settlers. According to Dr. Kalandar Khan, whose great-great-grandfather was among the early settlers, the Swahili people along the coast sought help from Oman after the Portuguese invaded the coastline and imposed a violent and dictatorial rule that the Swahili resented. When the Omanis arrived, they settled in the Old Town area in clans, building homes close to one another and also requiring a place of worship, which led to the construction of Mandhry Mosque. The mosque was named after the Mandhry clan, which settled in the Old Town, and has been maintained by the clan for centuries.

The mosque is notable for having survived the era of Portuguese rule along the coast.

The mosque was renovated in 1988.

== Architecture and design ==
The mosque is built in the Swahili architectural style. It is one of only two mosques in the world with two mihrabs (niches indicating the direction of Mecca), the other being the Masjid Qiblatain in Saudi Arabia.

Originally the mosque was white, it was constructed using coral burned into ash and mixed into a local lime mortar known as chokaa. Despite the rise of the Shafi school of Islam among Omanis on the Swahili Coast in the 16th century, Ibadi was still popular, which is reflected in the Mandhry Mosques Ibadi style. The exterior is simple, while the interior features five arched doors, four carved windows, inscriptions, benches, and arched openings. It also has a rounded minaret, a rare feature shared by only a few mosques along the Swahili Coast. Nearby is the Mandhry well, traditionally used for wudu (ablution). The mosque was later painted yellow to preserve it and distinguish it from surrounding buildings.

The oldest section of the mosque, built in 1570 and originally accommodating about ten worshippers, preserves several early features. It houses what is regarded as the oldest Quran in Kenya, kept in a weather-controlled case, along with the original minbar and Quranic inscriptions. Although the mosque was expanded about a century ago, these artifacts and the original interior structure remain intact in the earliest section.
