= Phillip Butah =

British visual artist (born 1981)

- Born: 1981 (age 44–45); Forest Gate, London, England
- Education: Central Saint Martins College of Art and Design
- Occupation: Visual artist
- Website: phillipbutah.com

Phillip Butah (born 1981) is a British visual artist. He has worked extensively with Charles III and Ed Sheeran, among others. He was the royal artist for Charles' state visit to Kenya in 2023.

== Early life and education ==
Butah was born in 1981 or 1982 in Forest Gate, East London and attended St Bonaventure's. He is second-generation British-Ghanaian, as his parents came to Britain in the late 1960s. Butah studied fine art at Central Saint Martins College of Art and Design in London.

== Career ==
In 1998, at age 16, Butah became the youngest-ever winner of Young Artists’ Britain: The Prince of Wales's Young Artists’ Award, organised by the Prince's Trust, where he first met Charles III (then Prince of Wales). Ed Sheeran's parents organised the award, and he later illustrated Sheeran for his 2011 EP No.5 Collaborations Project and albums + (2011) and X (2014). In 2014, Butah released a book with Sheeran, titled Ed Sheeran: A Visual Journey. Butah has also illustrated actor Ashley Walters and former Olympic sprinter Linford Christie in the past.

Butah was first invited to paint Charles at Clarence House in 2008. In 2023, Butah joined Charles and Queen Camilla on their state visit to Kenya hosted by President William Ruto, an experience Butah described as "life-changing". His oil on board painting Elephant Sanctuary, depicting Nairobi National Park, featured in a 2025 exhibition at Buckingham Palace, showcasing various pieces from Charles's royal tours. Butah illustrated Charles and Camilla for the June 2025 cover of Tatler to mark their twentieth wedding anniversary.
