= Abu Salama =

Companion (sahaba) of the Islamic prophet Muhammad

Abū Salama أبو سلمة
- Born: c. 582; Mecca, Hejaz, Arabian Peninsula
- Died: 625 CE (aged c. 43–48); Medina, First Islamic State
- Cause of death: Wounds sustained at the Battle of Uhud that reopened after leading the Expedition of Qatan.
- Relatives: Abd al-Asad ibn Hilal (father); Barrah bint Abd al-Muttalib (mother)
- Military career
- Allegiance: Muhammad
- Service years: c. 624–625
- Conflicts: Battle of Badr; Battle of Uhud; Expedition of Qatan †

Abū Salama ʿAbd Allāh ibn ʿAbd al-Asad (Arabic: أَبُو سَلَمَة عَبْد ٱلله ٱبْن عَبْد ٱلْأَسَد) was one of the companions of the Islamic prophet Muhammad. He was also a cousin and a foster-brother of Muhammad and Hamza ibn Abd al-Muttalib through their foster-mother Thuwaybah.

== Biography ==
Abū Salama was one of the early companions of Muḥammad. He was born to Barrah bint Abd al-Muttalib and ʿAbd al-Asad, thus making him the first cousin of Muḥammad; as Barrah was the full sister of Abd Allah ibn Abd al-Muttalib. He was married to Umm Salama, and they were among the first who converted to Islam. They had four children: Salama, Umar ibn salama Zaynab and Durra.

Abū Salama was also involved in the migration towards Ethiopia but later came back under the protection of his uncle Abu Talib ibn Abd al-Muttalib.

== Military campaigns during Muhammad's epoch ==
Abū Salama died from a wound he sustained during the Battle of Uhud that reopened after he had led the Expedition of Qatan. After his death, Muhammad married his widow Umm Salama.

He also participated in the Expedition of Qatan in which Muḥammad ordered to attack the Banu Asad bin Khuzaymah tribe after receiving intelligence that they were allegedly plotting to attack Medina. 3 people were captured by Muslims during the expedition.

== See also ==
- List of battles of Muhammad
