= Fayd =

- Village
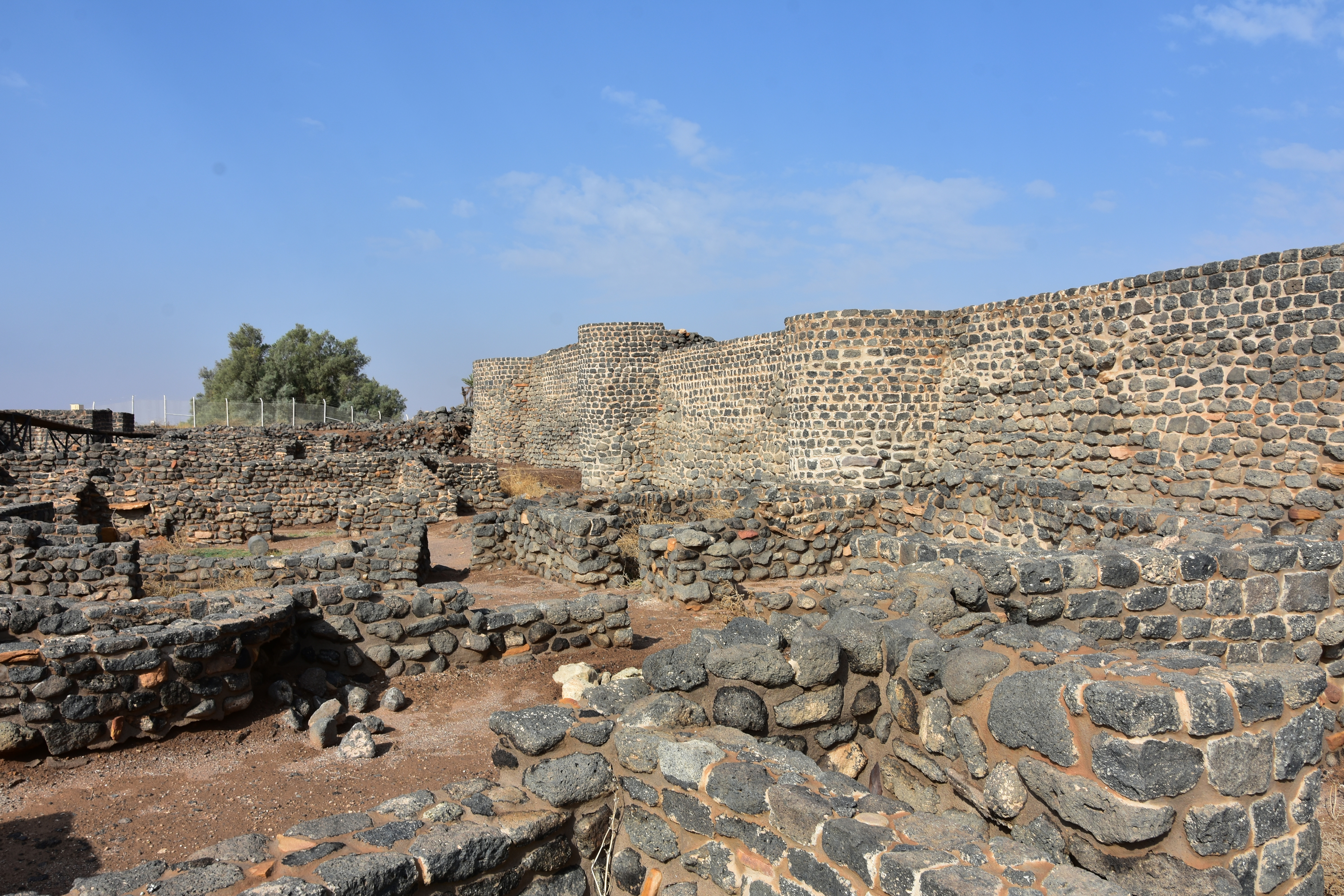

- Location in Saudi Arabia
- Coordinates: 21°55′02″N 39°23′18″E
- Country: Saudi Arabia
- Province: Makkah Province
- Time zone: UTC+3 (EAT)
  - Summer (DST): UTC+3 (EAT)

Fayd or Fa'idah is a village in Makkah Province, in western Saudi Arabia. The Expedition of Qatan was ordered by Muhammad and took place here.

== See also ==
- List of battles of Muhammad
- List of cities and towns in Saudi Arabia
- Regions of Saudi Arabia
