= Fall of Antioch =

Fall of Antioch may refer to:

- Battle of the Iron Bridge (637 AD)
- Siege of Antioch (1098)
- Siege of Antioch (1268)
