= Siege of Emesa =

635–636 CE siege of Byzantine Syrian city by the Rashidun Caliphate

Coordinates: 34.723185°N 36.714462°E

- Part of the Muslim conquest of Syria (Arab–Byzantine wars)
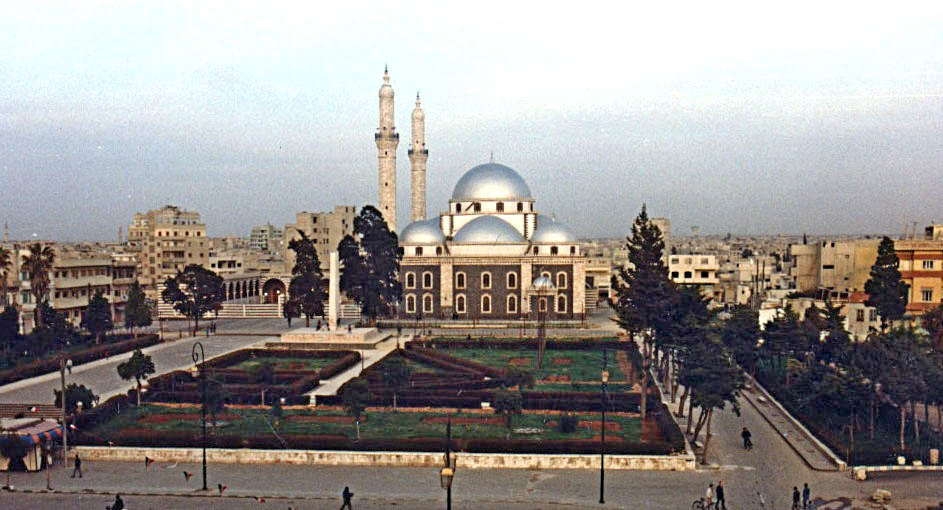
- Khalid ibn al-Walid mosque in Homs
Date	December 635–March 636 AD
Location	Emesa, Syria
Result	Rashidun victory
Territorial changes	Emesa captured by Rashidun Caliphate

Belligerents
Rashidun Caliphate	Byzantine Empire

Commanders and leaders
Abu Ubaidah ibn al-Jarrah; Khalid ibn al-Walid 'Ubadah ibn al-Samit	Harbees †

Strength
15,000	8,000

Casualties and losses
235	4,900

The siege of Emesa was laid by the forces of the Rashidun Caliphate from December 635 up until March 636. This led to the Islamic conquest of Emesa, which was a major trading city of the Byzantine Empire in the Levant.

== Background ==
After a decisive victory at the Battle of Ajnadayn, the Muslim army conquered Damascus after a nearly 13-month siege in September 634 AD. The army continued their march northward and in late 635 AD, Abu Ubayda ibn al-Jarrah sent Khalid ibn al-Walid with his mobile guard to begin the siege of Emesa and later joined him along with the main body of the army. The Byzantine garrisons of Emesa and Qinnasrin made a truce with the Muslim army. It was agreed that Emesa would pay 10,000 dinars and deliver 100 robes of brocade and in return, the Muslim army would not attack Emesa for one year. If, however, any Roman reinforcements arrived to strengthen Emesa's garrisons, then the truce would become defunct. The gates of Emesa were opened as soon as the truce was signed, and thereafter there was free movement of Muslims in and out of the markets of Emesa, advancing the economies of major Byzantine towns. The garrison of Qinnasrin made the truce on the same terms. However, the governors of Emesa and Qinnasrin made the truce for reasons of expediency. Both hoped that their garrisons would be reinforced by Emperor Heraclius, and as soon as that happened they would repudiate the extortion of the Muslims. Muslim armies raided many cities in northern Syria, as well as the major towns of Arethusa, Hama, Shaizar, Apamia (known today as Qalaat al-Madiq) and Al Ma'arra (now Maarrat al-Nu'man). One by one, each city and town that fell to the Muslim army surrendered in peace and agreed to pay the jizya.

It was while the Muslims were at Shaizar that they heard of Byzantine reinforcements moving to Qinnasrin and Emesa. This, naturally, led to the invalidation of the truce established by the city of Emesa. The arrival of winter gave the Byzantine garrison a further assurance of success. In their forts they would be better protected from the cold than the Muslim Arabs, who were not used to intense cold and with only their tents to give them shelter would suffer severely from the Syrian winter. Heraclius wrote to Harbees, the military governor of Emesa, "The food of these people is the flesh of the camel, and their drink is its milk. They cannot stand the cold. Fight them on every cold day so that none of them is left till the spring."

== Siege ==
Abu Ubaidah decided to take Emesa first and thus cleared his rear flank from the enemy before undertaking more serious operations in northern Syria. Consequently, the Muslim army marched to Emesa with Khalid's mobile guard in the lead. On arrival at the city, a short battle was fought between Khalid ibn al-Walid's mobile guard and the Byzantine garrison of Emesa. The Muslims drove the Byzantine guard back, which forced the Byzantines to withdraw into the fort and close the gates. Abu Ubaidah ibn al-Jarrah arrived with the rest of the army and deployed it into four groups opposite the four gates of Emesa:

1. Masdud Gate (to the southwest)
2. Tadmur Gate (to the north-east)
3. Duraib Gate (to the east)
4. Hud Gate (to the west)

Emesa was a fortified circular-shaped city with a diameter of less than a mile, and it was surrounded by a moat. There was also a citadel atop a hillock inside the fort. Outside the city stretched a fertile plain, broken only on the west by the Orontes River. Abu Ubaidah himself, together with Khalid and his mobile guard, camped on the north side, a short distance from the Rastan Gate. Abu Ubaidah left the siege in the hands of Khalid, who thus acted as the virtual commander of the Muslims for this operation. It was now late November or early December, and the winter was at its peak. The siege continued, and every day there was an exchange of archery, but no major action took place that could lead to a decision either way. The Byzantine expectations that the Muslims would not be able to withstand the cold of Emesa proved to be correct to some extent, but not as they imagined. It was about the middle of March 636, when the worst of the winter was over, that Harbees decided to make a surprise sally and defeat the Muslims in battle outside the fort, as the Byzantine hope of the cold driving the Muslims away vanished. Supplies were running low, and with the coming of spring and better weather, the Muslims would receive further reinforcements and would then be in an even stronger position. Early one morning the Rastan Gate was flung open, and Harbees led 5,000 men into a quick attack on the unsuspecting Muslim army facing that gate. The speed and violence of the attack took the Muslims by surprise, and although this was the largest of the four groups positioned at the four gates, it was driven back from the position where it had hastily formed up for battle. A short distance back the Muslims reformed their front and held the attack of the Byzantines, but the pressure became increasingly heavy, and the danger of a breakthrough became clearly evident. Abu Ubaidah sent Khalid ibn al-Walid to restore the situation. Khalid moved forward with the mobile guard, took the hard-pressed Muslims under his command, and redeployed the Muslim army for battle. After all these defensive measures Khalid took the offensive and steadily pushed the Romans back, though it was not till near sunset that the Romans were finally driven back into the fort. The sally had proved unsuccessful.

== Conquest of Emesa ==
The following morning Abu Ubaidah held a council of war and expressed his dissatisfaction with the manner in which the Muslims had given way before the Roman attack, whereupon Khalid remarked, "These Romans were the bravest I had ever met."

Abu Ubaidah asked Khalid for his advice, and Khalid told him his plan. The next morning they would make a fake withdrawal of the army from Emesa, giving the Byzantines the impression that the Muslims were raising the siege and were withdrawing to the south. The Byzantines would surely attack the rearguard of the withdrawing Muslim army, and at that moment the army would turn back, encircle the Byzantine army, and annihilate them.

According to the plan, early the following morning, the Muslims raised the siege and withdrew to the south. Viewing it as a brilliant military opportunity, Harbees immediately collected 5,000 Byzantine warriors and led them out of the fort to chase the Muslims. He launched his mounted force into a fast pursuit to catch up with the retreating Muslim forces and strike them down as they fled. The Byzantine army caught up with the Muslims a few miles from Emesa. The leading elements of Byzantine cavalry were about to pounce upon the 'retreating Muslims' when the Muslims suddenly turned and struck at the Byzantines with ferocity. As the Muslims turned on the Byzantines, Khalid shouted a command at which two mounted groups detached themselves from the Muslim army, galloped round the flanks of the surprised Byzantines, and charged from the rear. Steadily and systematically the Muslims closed in from all sides. It is said that Khalid, with a small group of elite mounted warriors of the mobile guard, reached the center of the Byzantines' army, and there he saw Harbees still fighting. Khalid made for Harbees but was intercepted by a giant Byzantine general, who was killed by Khalid after a duel. At the time when the Muslims started their attack on the encircled Romans, a group of 500 horsemen under Ma'az ibn Jabal had galloped back to Emesa to see to it that no escaping Roman got into the fort. As these horsemen neared Emesa, the terrified inhabitants and the remnants of the Roman garrison, which had not joined the pursuit, hastily withdrew into the fort and closed the gates. Ma'az deployed his men in front of the gates to prevent the Byzantines in Emesa from coming out and the Byzantines outside Emesa from getting in. It is recorded that only about a hundred Byzantines got away. The Muslims, on the other hand, lost about 235 dead in the entire operation against Emesa, from the beginning of the siege to the end of the last action. As soon as this action was over, the Muslims returned to Emesa and resumed the siege. The local inhabitants offered to surrender on terms, and Abu Ubaidah accepted the offer. This happened around the middle of March 636. The inhabitants paid the Jizya at the rate of one dinar per man, and peace returned to Emesa.

== Aftermath ==
Soon after the surrender of Emesa, the Muslims set out once again for the north, intending to take the whole of Northern Syria this time, including Aleppo and Antioch. They went past Hama and arrived at Shaizar. Here a Roman convoy taking provisions to Qinnasrin and escorted by a small body of soldiers was intercepted and captured by Khalid. The prisoners were interrogated, and they provided the information regarding the plan of Heraclius, and concentration of a large Byzantine army at Antioch. The Byzantine army met the Muslims in August 636 on the plain of Yarmuk where the Muslims won a decisive victory against the Byzantines in the Battle of Yarmuk.

=== Foundation of Jund Hims ===
After the Muslim conquest of Syria in the 7th century CE, Caliph Umar(r. 634–644) divided Syria into four districts, in which Jund Hims became the northernmost district. It initially encompassed the territory of Jund Hims proper, the territory of the future district of Jund Qinnasrin in far northern Syria, and the Jazira (i.e. Upper Mesopotamia). During and immediately following the Muslim conquest of the city of Homs (Emesa to the Byzantines), the city became home to a substantial concentration of South Arabian tribesmen from the Himyar, Hamdan, Kinda, Khawlan, Alhan and Hadhramawt groups.

=== Siege of Emesa in 638 ===
In 637-638 AD, Heraclius resorted to enlisting the large swath of Arab Christian allies that inhabited al-Jazira, or upper Mesopotamia, area to mount a counteroffensive against the encroaching Caliphate forces. So the massive forces of Arab Christian coalitions immediately marched towards Syria, laying siege to Emesa. However, as the bulk of the coalition forces underwent the siege, the ingenious Abu Ubayda ordered the garrison forces inside Emesa to remain static while he sent the Caliphate forces elsewhere under Iyad ibn Ghanm to invade straight into the homeland of the coalition forces. The cities of Hit, Circesium, Amid, Mayyafariqin, Nisibin, Tur Abdin, Mardin, Dara, Qarda, and Bazabda fell victim to the rapid conquest of Iyadh, which capitalized on the situation where those cities were undermanned. This resulted in panic aroused among the coalition forces that bogged down outside the wall of Emesa, which prompted them to abandon the siege and hastily go to their endangered homeland. However, Khalid ibn Walid took his cavalry to pursue the retreating coalition forces and inflicted heavy losses on them.

== Trivia ==
Harbees was buried in Al-Qarabis (Arabic: القرابيص) neighborhood which was named after him.

== Bibliography ==
- Crone, Patricia (1980). Slaves on Horses: The Evolution of the Islamic Polity (1980 ed.). Cambridge: Cambridge University Press. ISBN 978-0521229616.
- Crone, Patricia (1994). "Were the Qays and Yemen of the Umayyad Period Political Parties?" (PDF). Der Islam. 71: 1–57. doi:10.1515/islm.1994.71.1.1. S2CID 154370527.
- Hinds, M. (1993). "Muʿāwiya I b. Abī Sufyān". In Bosworth, C. E.; van Donzel, E.; Heinrichs, W. P. & Pellat, Ch. (eds.). The Encyclopaedia of Islam, Second Edition. Volume VII: Mif–Naz. Leiden: E. J. Brill. pp. 263–268. ISBN 978-90-04-09419-2.
- Kennedy, Hugh (2001). The Armies of the Caliphs: Military and Society in the Early Islamic State. London and New York: Routledge. ISBN 0-415-25093-5.
- Madelung, Wilferd (1986). "Apocalyptic Prophecies in Hims in the Umayyad Age". Journal of Semitic Studies. 31 (2): 141–185. doi:10.1093/jss/XXXI.2.141.
