= Battle of Marj ar-Rum =

635 CE conflict between the Rashidun Caliphate and Byzantine Empire

- Part of the Muslim conquest of Syria (Arab–Byzantine wars)
| Date | March 635 |
| Location | Marj ar-Rum (first battle); Marj ad-Dimashq (second battle) 33°30′49.71″N 36°16′35.5″E |
| Result | Rashidun victory |

Belligerents
| Rashidun Caliphate | Byzantine Empire |

Commanders and leaders
| Yazid ibn Abi Sufyan; Abu Ubayda ibn al-Jarrah; Khalid ibn al-Walid | Theodore the Patricius †; Shannash al-Rum †; Sheodore † |

Strength
| Unknown | Unknown |

Casualties and losses
| Unknown | Heavy |

The Battle of Marj ar-Rum (Arabic: معركة مرج الروم, lit. 'Meadow of Rome'), also known as the Battle of Marj ad-Dimashq (Arabic: معركة مرج الدمشق, lit. 'Meadow of Damascus'), was a battle between the Rashidun Caliphate and the Byzantine Empire that occurred shortly after the Battle of Fahl, when the Byzantines attempted to recapture Damascus. Heraclius, the Byzantine emperor, sent two separate forces in the effort, one army led by Theodore the Patricius and another led by Shannash al-Rum. The Rashidun army led by Abu Ubayda ibn al-Jarrah and Khalid ibn al-Walid was ordered to assist Yazid ibn Abi Sufyan, who was acting as the garrison commander of Damascus.

The battle consisted of two separate engagements, however, Muslim historians regard these conflicts as a single battle because the fighting occurred concurrently and Khalid participated in both engagements.

The battle is considered as a decisive victory for the Rashidun army as all the Byzantine commanders were killed and the threat of losing Damascus ended.

== Background ==
After the capture of Damascus, the Rashidun army split its forces as it continued the conquest of the Levant. Amr ibn al-Aas and Shurhabil ibn Hasana moved south to capture Palestine, while Abu Ubaidah and Khalid moved north to capture northern Syria. Such a deployment of the Muslim forces left Yazid ibn Abi Sufyan as the lone defender of Damascus. Sensing an opportunity to recover Damascus, Heraclius immediately sent an army under the command of Theodore the Patrician to recapture the city. Included in Theodore's army was a sizable cavalry. By the time that the Rashidun army learned of Theodore's movements, Abu Ubaydah and Khalid had defeated the Byzantines in Fahl and immediately moved to intercept Theodore.

Shortly thereafter, Theodore was reinforced by Shannash al-Rome's army which also included a sizeable cavalry force. Ultimately the two opposing forces met west of Damascus at the plain of Marj ar-Rum where the two armies drew up and faced each other in battle formation, Theodore opposite Khalid and Shannash opposite Abu Ubaydah. After drawing up, each of the armies remained in battle formation waiting for the other to make the first move. When night fell, Theodore and his vice commander Sheodore quietly pulled back their troops under the cover of darkness to advance upon Damascus.

== Battles ==
In the morning at Marj ar-Rum, the battle began with a personal duel between the field commanders, wherein Shannash was slain by Abu Ubaydah. Thereafter the two armies engaged in prolonged, but balanced combat. During the battle it became apparent to the Muslims that a portion of the Byzantine force had slipped off and that Damascus was now under attack. At that time, Khalid and his mobile guard disengaged themselves and rushed to Damascus.

When the Byzantine force under the command of Theodore and Sheodore reached Damascus, Yazid bin Abi Sufyan immediately deployed his forces and engaged the Byzantines outside the city. Despite being outnumbered, Yazid and the Damascus garrison were able hold their position for a considerable time before starting to fall back. Fortunately for the Muslims, Khalid and his cavalry arrived at about that time attacking the Byzantines from behind. As so, the Byzantines were caught in an untenable position, squeezed between the two Muslim forces. In the fighting, Khalid killed Theodore in single combat. Ultimately, Sheodore was also killed and the Roman lines thrown into confusion. Eventually, the Byzantines fled the field. The news of the upset at Damascus quickly spread to the field at Marj ar-Rum causing the Byzantine forces to lose their nerve and retreat, ending the battle.

== Aftermath ==
After the battle, the army of the Rashidun caliphate immediately seized the weapons, clothes, and mounts of the Byzantines. Yazid divided the booty among his soldiers and Khalid. A week later, Abu Ubaida captured Baalbek (Heliopolis) where the Temple of Jupiter stood later sending Khalid to attack Emesa.

== See also ==
- Siege of Damascus (634)

== Citations ==
- Akram, Agha Ibrahim (2006). The Sword of Allah Khalid Bin Al-Waleed, His Life and Campaigns. Mr. Books. pp. 359–417.
- Allenby, Viscount (2003), Conquerors of Palestine Through Forty Centuries, Kessinger Publishing, ISBN 0-7661-3984-0
- "Expansion of Islam and Military Campaigns - Battle Of Marj-ur-rum". Alim. Alim.org. 2022.
- Hasan, Masudul (1997). Hadrat Umar Farooq Allahʻs Blessings be Upon Him. Kitab Bhavan. p. 453. ISBN 978-81-7151-229-4.
- Ridha, Muhammad (2007). AL FAROUK OMAR IBN AL-KHATTAB THE SECOND CALIPH. Dar Al Kotob Al Ilmiyah دار الكتب العلمية. p. 172. ISBN 9782745155610.
- Tabari, Muhammad ibn Jarir (1992). The history of at-Tabari Vol. 12 (Yohanan Friedmann ed.). SUNY Press. p. 174. ISBN 9780791407332.

== General references ==
- Abu Tabikh, Muhsin; Abu Tabikh, Ali (1998). الرحلة المحسنية (digitized ed.). dar al'adwa.
- Muir, William (1883). Annals of the Early Caliphate From Original Sources (general history). Smith, Elder & Company. pp. 197–198.
- Ilkka SYVÄNNE (2019). "The Capture of Jerusalem by the Muslims in 634". Historia i Świat. 8 (8). Israel: University of Haifa: 37–58. doi:10.34739/his.2019.08.03. hdl:11331/2593. S2CID 216617895.
- Ibn Taymiyyah, Taqī ad-Dīn ʾAḥmad ibn ʿAbd al-Ḥalīm ibn ʿAbd al-Salām al-Numayrī al-Ḥarrānī. Islamic Books by Ibn Taymiyyah Maqdisi and Abdullah Azzam. Рипол Классик. p. 367. ISBN 9785872420279.
