= Abu Ubayda ibn al-Jarrah =

Companion of Muhammad and military leader (583–639)

Abu Ubayda ibn al-Jarrah أبي عبيدة بن الجراح Amin al-Ummah

Governor of Syria
- In office 634–639
- Caliph: Umar
- Preceded by: Position established
- Succeeded by: Yazid ibn Abi Sufyan

Commander-in-Chief of the Rashidun Army
- In office 634–639
- Caliph: Umar
- Preceded by: Khalid ibn al-Walid

Personal details
- Born: c. 583 Mecca, Hejaz, Arabia
- Died: c. 639 (aged 55–56) Syria, Rashidun Caliphate
- Resting place: Mosque of Abu Ubayda Amir ibn al-Jarrah, Jordan
- Parent(s): Abd Allah ibn al-Jarrah; Umayma bint Ghanm
- Religion: Islam
- Tribe: Quraysh (Banu Fihr)

Military service
- Allegiance: Muhammad (624–630); Rashidun Caliphate (632–639)
- Branch/service: Rashidun army
- Years of service: 632–639
- Rank: Field Commander (632–634); Commander-in-Chief (634–639)
- Battles/wars: List: Under Muhammad; Battle of Badr; Battle of Uhud; Battle of the Trench; Siege of Banu Qurayza; Expedition of Banu Thalabah; Battle of Khaybar; Expedition of Dhat al-Salasil; Expedition of Al-Khabt; Conquest of Mecca; Battle of Hunayn; Siege of Ta'if; Expedition of Tabuk; Under Rashidun Caliphate; Ridda Wars; Muslim conquest of Syria; Battle of Ajnadayn; Siege of Damascus; Battle of Sanita-al-Uqab; Battle of Marj al-Dibaj; Battle of Fahl; Battle of Marj al-Saffar; Battle of Marj ar-Rum; Siege of Emesa; Battle of the Yarmuk; Siege of Jerusalem; Siege of Aleppo; Battle of the Iron Bridge; Siege of Emesa

Abū ʿUbayda ibn al-Jarrāḥ (Arabic: أبو عبيدة بن الجراح, born ʿĀmir ibn ʿAbd Allāh ibn al-Jarrāḥ; 583–639 CE), was a Muslim commander and one of the Companions of the Prophet, noted for his piety, intelligence, bravery, and devotion to Muhammad. An early convert to Islam, he participated in all major military campaigns of Muhammad, including the Battle of Badr and the Battle of Uhud, and commanded a division during the Conquest of Mecca. Muhammad gave him the honorific al-Amīn ("the Trustworthy"), also rendered Amīn al-Ummah ("Trustee of the Community"), and is said to have promised him paradise.

His courage in the early battles and his leadership qualities made him a prominent figure among Muhammad's companions. He was later sent as a preacher to Najran to instruct newly converted tribes in Islam. During the Rashidun Caliphate, he played an instrumental role in the political transition and succession of Abu Bakr at the Saqifa assembly. Under Abu Bakr he served as a commander in Syria, and during the caliphate of Umar he became supreme commander of the Syrian army, succeeding Khalid ibn al-Walid as commander in chief. He led the army that conquered Jerusalem in 636.

Abu Ubayda participated prominently in the Muslim conquest of Syria, conquering Damascus, Homs, Antioch, and Aleppo, and subsequently administering these territories successfully. Umar also designated him among the candidates for succession to the caliphate. He died in 639 (AH 18) during the Plague of Amwas, which claimed the lives of many Muslim warriors.

== Early life and conversion ==
Abu Ubayda belonged to the al-Harith ibn Fihr clan of the Quraysh tribe. He was born around 583. His full name was Amir ibn Abd Allah ibn al-Jarrah ibn Hilal ibn Uhayb ibn Dabba ibn al-Harith. The clan was settled in the lower quarter of Mecca, a town in the Hejaz (western Arabia) and home of the Quraysh. During the pre-Islamic period (pre-620s), the al-Harith ibn Fihr were allied to the Banu Abd Manaf (the ancestral clan of the Islamic prophet Muhammad) in the Mutayyabun faction, against the other Qurayshite clans headed by the Banu Abd al-Dar. Abu Ubayda's father Abd Allah was among the chiefs of the Quraysh in the Fijar War against the Hawazin nomads in the late 6th century. His mother was Umayma bint Ghanm, also belonging to the Quraysh.

Abu Ubayda was among the earliest converts to Islam, specifically recorded as the ninth person to accept the faith. According to traditional accounts, he embraced Islam alongside Uthman ibn Maz'un and Abd al-Rahman ibn Awf before Muhammad began preaching from the house of al-Arqam. Following the migration to Medina, he was established in a bond of brotherhood with Muhammad ibn Maslama.

== Military career under Muhammad ==
In 624, Abu Ubayda participated in the first major battle between the Muslims and the Quraysh of Mecca at the Battle of Badr, where he encountered his polytheist father, Abd Allah ibn al-Jarrah, who fought on the side of the Quraysh. According to historical commentators such as Sa'id ibn Abd al-Aziz, the verse (Quran 58:22), "You will not find any people who believe in Allah and the Last Day...", was revealed regarding Abu Ubayda after he killed his father in the engagement.

In 625, Abu Ubayda participated in the Battle of Uhud. During the engagement, when Khalid ibn al-Walid's cavalry attacked the Muslims from the rear and turned an initial advantage into chaos, the bulk of the Muslim soldiers were driven from the battlefield. Abu Ubayda was among those who remained steadfast, guarding Muhammad against the attacks of the Qurayshi forces. During the fighting, he lost his two front teeth while using his mouth to extract two iron links of Muhammad's helmet or armor that had pierced Muhammad's cheeks. Subsequently, Abu Ubayda participated alongside Muhammad in all major military campaigns, including the Battle of the Trench.

He led the Expedition of al-Khabt, a coastal reconnaissance operation directed toward the seashore. Later, during the Expedition of Expedition of Dhat al-Salasil in 630, Abu Ubayda served as the commander over the contingents of the Muhajirun and the Ansar. Following this, after a Christian delegation from Najran arrived and requested someone to guide them in religious and tribal affairs according to Islamic law, Muhammad appointed Abu Ubayda for the mission, describing him as a trustworthy man.

== Role in the succession of Abu Bakr ==
When Muhammad died in 632, Abu Ubayda was in Mecca. The Muslim leaders were in disagreement over who would succeed him as leader of their nascent community. On the same day of the Islamic prophet's death, the Ansar convened in a controversial meeting that became known as the Saqifa. They chose one of their own as caliph. Their principal aim was to prevent a Meccan, especially the new converts among the Qurayshi aristocracy, from gaining power over them.

Opinions among the Muhajirun were split, with one side favouring a person closer to Muhammad in kinship, namely Ali, who they held was favoured by Muhammad to succeed him. The other faction of the Muhajirun mostly backed Abu Bakr due to his seniority, closeness to Muhammad, and the increasingly important role he had attained in the prophet's last years. The bulk of the Qurayshite new converts, with the prominent exception of Abu Sufyan, backed Abu Bakr.

The Islamic tradition generally portrays Abu Bakr, Umar and Abu Ubayda as operating in concert and decisively intervening against the Ansar at Saqifa. After a debate, the triumvirate obtained the allegiance of the Ansar to Abu Bakr despite their reservations. There are indications, according to the modern historian Elias Shoufani, that Umar initially favoured Abu Ubayda but that he lacked sufficient support against Abu Bakr, who he consequently supported against other potential candidates. A report in the history of al-Baladhuri holds that after Muhammad died, Umar told Abu Ubayda, "Stretch your hand and let us give you the bay'ah [oath of allegiance], for you are the custodian (Amīn) of this ummah (the Muslim community), as the prophet called you". Abu Ubayda is then said to have declined the approach in favour of Abu Bakr. Another report in the history of al-Tabari holds that Abu Bakr offered the caliphate to Umar or Abu Ubayda at the Saqifa, but both insisted on Abu Bakr's succession.

== Commander in Syria ==
=== Deployment and appointment of Abu Ubayda to supreme command ===
As the Ridda wars came to an end, Abu Bakr dispatched three or four armies at different intervals toward Byzantine Syria to conquer that region. Though there are several versions in the early Islamic tradition, including in the works of Ibn Hubaysh al-Asadi (fl. 12th century), al-Mas'udi (d. 956), al-Azdi (d. 944), as well as the 10th-century-compiled Kitab al-Aghani, that place Abu Ubayda as one of these commanders, modern research, including by historians H. A. R. Gibb, C. H. Becker, Philip K. Hitti, Andreas Stratos, D. R. Hill and Khalil Athamina, date Abu Ubayda's dispatch to after Abu Bakr's death. In the comprehensive 9th-century history of the early Muslim conquests by al-Baladhuri, the latter states "there is no truth" to the claim that Abu Ubayda was sent by Abu Bakr. Rather, the caliph "intended to send Abu ʿUbayda at the head of one of the armies, but the latter asked the caliph to relieve him of this mission". Athamina assesses that "certain allusions" in the Islamic sources offer context to the notion that Abu Ubayda, despite his participation in several expeditions under Muhammad and his high-standing among the Muslims, did not have the desire nor the necessary military experience and merit to accept the post Abu Bakr offered him.

Modern research indicates that Abu Ubayda was dispatched to the Syrian front by Abu Bakr's successor, Umar, and early Muslim authors al-Baladhuri, al-Fasawi (d. 890) and Ibn Asakir (d. 1175) mention that it was in the capacity as commander of an army of reinforcements. His arrival most likely dated to around 636, shortly after the first Muslim capture of Damascus in late 635 or during the preparation for the subsequent Battle of the Yarmuk. At the time, supreme command of the Muslim armies in Syria was held by Khalid ibn al-Walid with Abu Ubayda playing a supportive role to Khalid. Umar may have sent Abu Ubayda to assume the supreme command. Several accounts in the Islamic tradition claim Abu Ubayda concealed the caliph's order from the rest of the army to avoid potentially insulting Khalid or provoking a mutiny while the Muslims were on the cusp of a major confrontation with the Byzantines. Athamina dismisses the reliability of these claims, considering them militarily illogical and meant to dramatise the change in command and emphasise Abu Ubayda's "moral superiority and unselfishness". Instead, Athamina maintains Abu Ubayda's appointment to the supreme command was made by Umar, who had kept in constant contact with Abu Ubayda through letters and emissaries, after the decisive Muslim victory at the Yarmuk.

Abu Ubayda may have been chosen to lead at that time, when the Byzantine defence of Syria had taken an enormous blow, as the circumstances called for an able administrator to take the helm from a military commander like Khalid. The Islamic tradition provides a host of moral and personal reasons why Khalid was demoted in favour of Abu Ubayda, but most modern historians view these as either partially valid or literary innovations. Athamina holds Abu Ubayda was likely installed because Khalid and his large force of tribesmen from Arabia and Iraq, along with their families, presented a threat to the old-established, formerly Byzantine-allied, and militarily experienced Arab tribes of Syria, whose defection was considered vital by Umar to form a network of defences against the Byzantines. This motivated him to demote Khalid and disband his army, the remnants of which were transferred to the Sasanian front in Iraq.

=== Ajnadayn and Damascus ===
During 634, the Muslims heard that 90,000 strong Byzantine army had gathered at Ajnadayn about 15 mi (24 km) southwest of Jerusalem. All the divisions of the Muslim army, about 32,000 in number, joined Khalid at Ajnadayn on 24 July 634. Under the command of Khalid ibn al-Walid the Muslims defeated the Byzantine army there on 30 July 634 at the Battle of Ajnadayn. One week later, Khalid, along with Abu Ubayda, moved towards Damascus. On their way to Damascus, they defeated another Byzantine army at the Battle of Yaqusa in mid-August 634. Caloiis and Azrail, the governor of Damascus, led another army to stop Khalid's corps but they were also defeated in the Battle of Marj al-Saffar on 19 August 634.

The next day the Muslims reached Damascus and besieged the city. The siege continued for 30 days. After defeating the Byzantine reinforcements sent by Emperor Heraclius at the Battle of Sanita-al-Uqab, 20 mi (32 km) from Damascus, Khalid's forces attacked and entered the city. With Khalid's divisions investing the city from the northeast, Thomas, the purported son-in-law of the Emperor Heraclius, surrendered the city to Abu Ubayda, who was besieging the Bab al-Jabiya (Jabiya Gate), on 19 September 634.

Abu Ubayda had been appointed by Khalid ibn al-Walid to lay siege the Jabiya Gate of Damascus. Abu Ubayda, Shurahbil ibn Hasana and Amr ibn al-As put forward a peace proposal to the citizens of Damascus after Khalid ibn al-Walid attacked the city and conquered it by force, as they were unaware of Khalid's attack from the Eastern Gate. The peace proposal was reluctantly endorsed by Khalid. The Byzantine army was given a cease fire of three days and allowed to go as far as they could with their families and treasure. Others residents simply agreed to stay in Damascus and pay tribute. The Muslims controlled the road to Emesa, so the Byzantines went west and then north up the Beqaa Valley. After the three-day truce was over, the Muslim cavalry, under Khalid's command, pursued the Byzantine column via the shorter Emesa road and caught up with them in the northwest Beqaa Valley, just before they entered the mountains en route to Antioch at the Battle of Marj al-Dibaj.

=== Conquest of central Syria ===
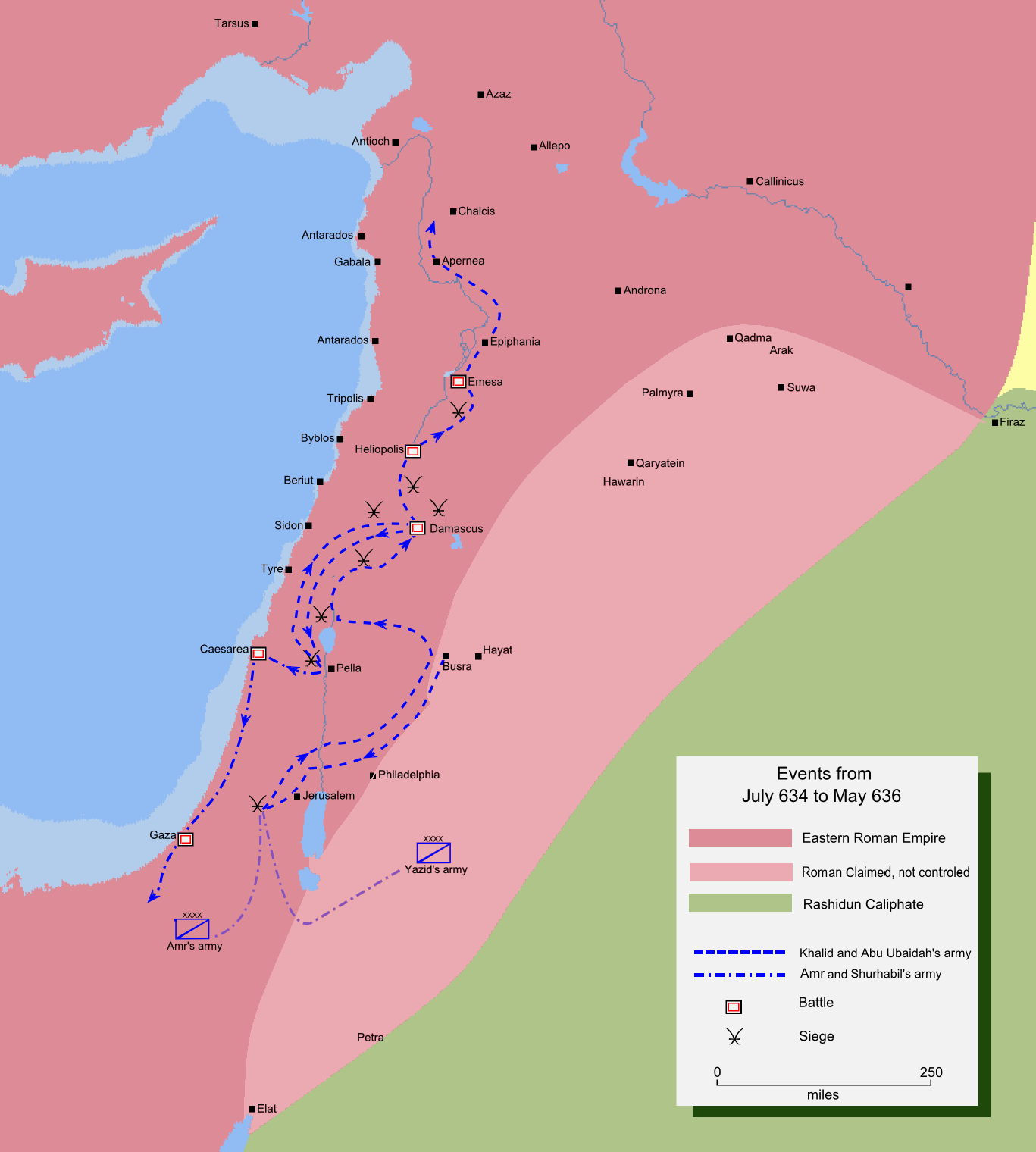
Map detailing the route of Khalid ibn al-Walid's invasion of central Syria.

Soon after the appointment of Abu Ubayda as commander-in-chief, he sent a small detachment to the annual fair held near Abla, close to Zahlé east of Beirut. A Byzantine and Christian Arab force present in the area confronted the detachment, whose size had been miscalculated by Muslim informants, and quickly encircled it. Before the detachment could be destroyed, Abu Ubayda, having received new intelligence, sent Khalid to reinforce them. Khalid reached the area in time, broke the encirclement, and defeated the opposing forces on 15 October 634, returning with significant booty from the fair and a number of prisoners.

With central Syria captured, the Muslims had given the Byzantines a decisive blow. For the Byzantines, communications between northern Syria and Palestine were now cut off. Abu Ubayda decided to march to Fahl (Pella), which is about 500 ft (150 m) below sea level, and where a strong Byzantine garrison and survivors of the Battle of Ajnadayn were present. The region was crucial because from there the Byzantine army could strike eastwards and cut communications lines with Arabia. Moreover, with this large garrison at the rear, Palestine could not be invaded. Thus the Muslim army moved to Fahl. The Byzantine army was defeated at the Battle of Fahl on 23 January 635.

=== Battles for Emesa and the second battle of Damascus ===
After the battle, which would prove to be a key to Palestine and Jordan, the Muslim armies split up. Shurahbeel and Amr's corps moved south to capture Palestine. Meanwhile, Abu Ubayda and Khalid, with a relatively larger corps, moved north to conquer Lebanon and northern Syria.

While the Muslims were occupied at Fahl, Heraclius, sensing the opportunity, quickly sent an army under General Theodore Trithyrius to recapture Damascus, where a small Muslim garrison had been left. Shortly after Heraclius dispatched this new army, the Muslims, having finished the business at Fahl, were on their way to Emesa. The Byzantine army met the Muslims halfway to Emesa, at Maraj al-Rome. During the night, Theodras sent half of his army towards Damascus to launch a surprise attack on the Muslim garrison.

Khalid's spy informed him about the move. Khalid, having received permission from Abu Ubayda, galloped towards Damascus with his mobile guard. While Abu Ubayda fought and defeated the Byzantine army in the Battle of Marj ar-Rum, Khalid moved to Damascus with his light cavalry and attacked and defeated Theodras in the second battle of Damascus.

A week later, Abu Ubayda moved towards Heliopolis (Baalbek), where the great Temple of Jupiter stood. Heliopolis surrendered to Muslim rule after little resistance and agreed to pay tribute. Abu Ubayda sent Khalid towards Emesa.

Emesa and Chalcis sued for peace for a year. Abu Ubayda accepted the offer. So rather than invading the districts of Emesa and Chalcis, he consolidated his rule in conquered land and captured Hama, Maarrat al-Nu'man. The peace treaties were, however, on Heraclius's instructions, to slow down the Muslim advance and to secure time for the preparation of the defences across northern Syria (present-day Lebanon, Syria and southern Turkey). Having mustered sizeable armies at Antioch, Heraclius sent them to reinforce strategically important areas of northern Syria, such as Emesa and Chalcis. With the arrival of Byzantine army in the city, the peace treaty was violated. So Abu Ubadiah and Khalid marched to Emesa, and the Byzantine army that had halted Khalid's advance guard was defeated. The Muslims besieged Emesa, which was finally conquered in March 636 after a six months' siege.

=== Battle of the Yarmuk ===
Muslim and Byzantine Troop Movements before the battle of the Yarmuk.

Topographical and strategic map of the Battle of the Yarmuk (636 CE), depicting key locations, Roman and Muslim troop positions, roads, rivers, and terrain features. Based on historical sources, including Syvänne (2019), Kaegi (1992), and GIS data. Rashidun Army Byzantine army Yarmuk River Current boundary

After capturing Emesa, the Muslims moved north to capture the whole of the northern Syria. Khalid, acting as an advance guard raided northern Syria. At Shaizer, Khalid intercepted a convoy taking provisions for Chalcis. The prisoners were interrogated and informed him about Emperor Heraclius' ambitious plan to take back Syria. They told him that an army, possibly 200,000 strong, would soon emerge to recapture their territory. After his past experience fighting the Muslim armies, Heraclius, was avoiding pitch battles with the Muslims. He planned to send massive reinforcements to all the major cities and isolate the Muslim corps from each other, and thus separately encircle and destroy the Muslim armies. In June 636, five massive armies were sent by Heraclius to recapture Syria.

Khalid, sensing Heraclius's plan, feared that the Muslim armies would be isolated and destroyed. In a council of war he suggested that Abu Ubayda draw all the Muslim armies to one place so as to fight a decisive battle with the Byzantines. Agreeing with Khalid's suggestion, Abu Ubayda ordered all the Muslim armies in Syria to evacuate the lands they had conquered and meet at Jabiya. This manoeuvre turned out to be a decisive blow to the Heraclius's plan, as he did not wish engage his troops in an open battle with the Muslims, where their light cavalry could be effectively used. On Khalid's suggestion, Abu Ubayda ordered the Muslim army to withdraw from Jabiya to the plain on the Yarmuk River, where cavalry could be used. While the Muslim armies were gathering at the Yarmuk, Khalid intercepted and routed the Byzantine advance guard. This was to ensure the safe retreat of the Muslims to Yarmuk.

The Muslim armies reached the Yarmuk in July 636. Around mid July, the Byzantine army arrived. The Byzantine commander in chief, Vahan, sent Christian Arab troops of the Ghassanid king, Jabala ibn al-Ayham, to check the strength of the Muslims. Khalid's mobile guard defeated and routed the Christian Arabs; this was the last action before the battle started. For the next month negotiations continued between the two armies, and Khalid went to meet Vahan in person at Byzantine camp. Meanwhile, the Muslims received reinforcements sent by Caliph Umar.

Finally on 15 August, the Battle of the Yarmuk was fought. It lasted for 6 days and ended in a devastating defeat for the Byzantines. The battle of the Yarmuk is considered to be a historic defeat that sealed the fate of Byzantines in the Middle East. The magnitude of defeat was so intense that Byzantine would never recover from it. It potentially left the whole of the Byzantine Empire vulnerable to Muslim attack.

=== Siege of Jerusalem ===
With the Byzantine army shattered and routed, the Muslims quickly recaptured the territory that they conquered prior to Yarmuk. Abu Ubayda held a meeting with his high command, including Khalid, to decide on future conquests. They decided to conquer Jerusalem. The Siege of Jerusalem lasted four months after which the city agreed to surrender, but only to caliph Umar in person. Amr ibn al-As suggested that Khalid should be sent as if he was the caliph, because of his very strong resemblance to Umar. However, Khalid was recognized. So the surrender of Jerusalem was delayed until Umar arrived with Jerusalem formally surrendering on April 637. After capture of Jerusalem, the Muslim armies separated once again. Yazid's corps went to Damascus and captured Beirut. Amr and Shurahbil's corps went on to conquer the rest of Palestine, while Abu Ubayda and Khalid, at the head of a 17,000 strong army moved north to conquer whole of the northern Syria.

Abu Ubayda sent the commanders Amr ibn al-As, Yazid ibn Abi Sufyan, and Shurahbil ibn Hasana back to their areas to reconquer them. Most of the areas submitted without a fight. Abu Ubayda, along with Khalid, moved to northern Syria to reconquer that area with a 17,000 strong army. Khalid along with his cavalry was sent to Hazir and Abu Ubayda moved to Chalcis.

=== Conquest of northern Syria ===
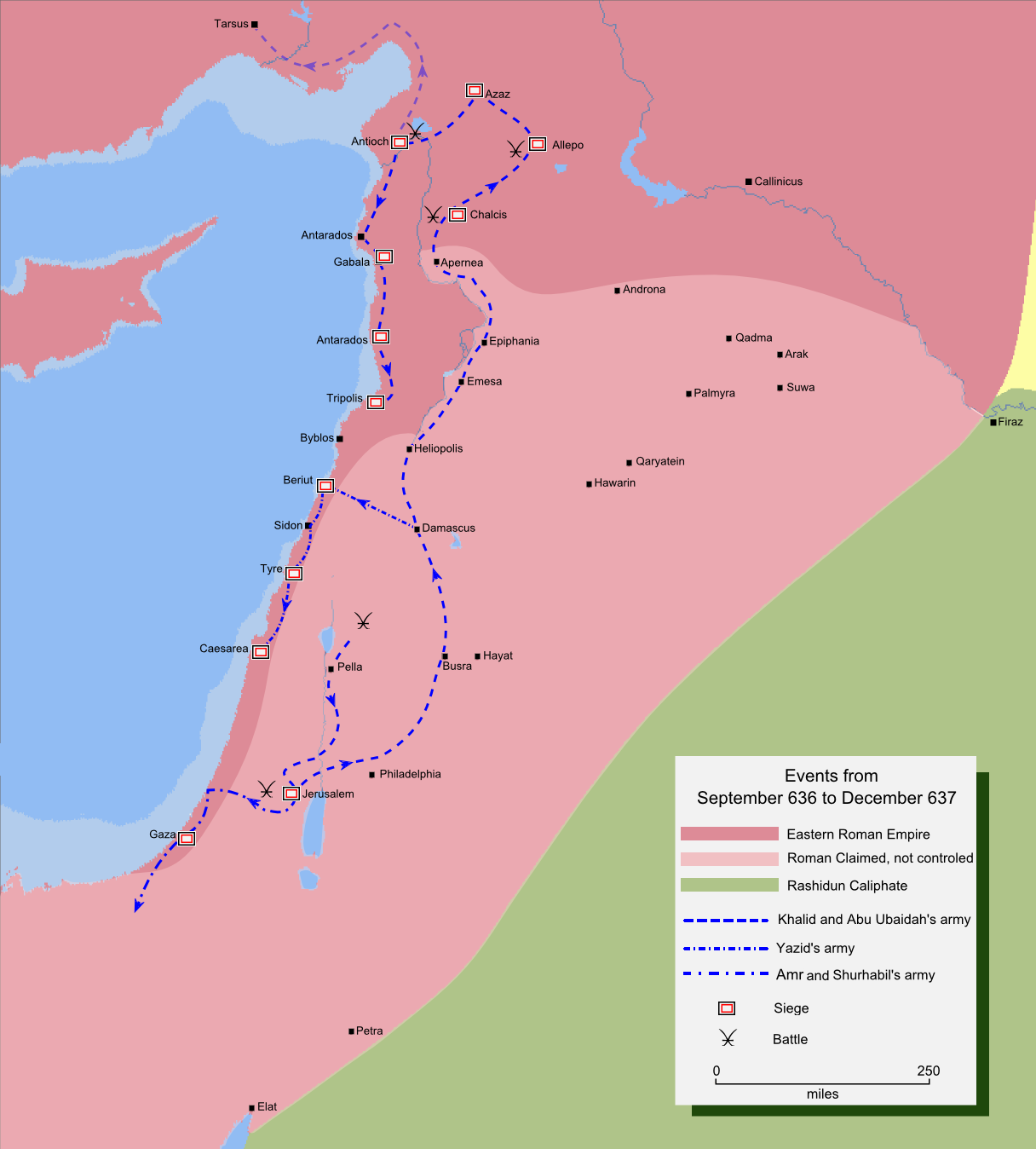
Map detailing the route of Khalid ibn al-Walid's invasion of northern Syria.

=== Defence of Emesa ===
After the devastating defeat in the Battle of the Yarmuk, the remainder of the Byzantine empire was left vulnerable. With few military resources left, it was no longer in a position to attempt a military comeback in Syria. To gain time to prepare a defence of the rest of his empire, Heraclius needed to keep the Muslims occupied in Syria. Heraclius thus sought help from the Christian Arab tribes based in Jazira and were mainly from Circesium and Hīt. The tribes mustered a large army and marched to besiege Emesa. Abu Ubayda withdrew all his forces from northern Syria to Emesa as a part of complex strategy which he devised to repel the invasion of the Christian Arab forces against Emesa. Caliph Umar instructed Abu Ubayda to send field commanders outside Emesa with sufficient forces to lay counter siege to cities in Jazira, homeland of enemy Arab Christian tribes, in order to divert the focus of enemy concentration in Emesa. So in 638 the Muslim forces under Iyad ibn Ghanm attacked Hīt, which they found to be well fortified. So they left some of the army to lay siege to the city, while the rest of the army went on to Circesium. Khalid was in favour of an open battle outside the fort, but Abu Ubayda sought Umar's advice, who handled the situation brilliantly. Umar sent detachments of the Muslim army from Iraq to invade Al-Jazira, homeland of the invading Christian Arabs, from three different routes. Moreover, another detachment was sent to Emesa from Iraq under Al-Qa'qa ibn Amr, a veteran of Yarmuk who had been sent to Iraq for the Battle of al-Qadisiyyah. Umar himself marched from Medina at the head of 1,000 men. The Christian Arabs, when they received the news of the Muslim invasion of their homeland, abandoned the siege and hastily withdrew to Al-Jazira. At this point Khalid and his mobile guard came out of the fort and devastated the army, attacking them from the rear.

=== After Emesa ===
Abu Ubayda sent Khalid, with his elite cavalry, the mobile guard, towards Chalcis. The fort was guarded by the Greek troops under their commander, Menas, who was reported to be of high prestige, second only to the emperor himself. Menas, diverting from conventional Byzantine tactics, decided to face Khalid and destroy the leading elements of the Muslim army before the main body could join them at Hazir, 5 km (3.1 mi) east of Chalcis. This resulted in the Battle of Hazir, which led to Umar praising Khalid's military genius. Umar is reported to have said:

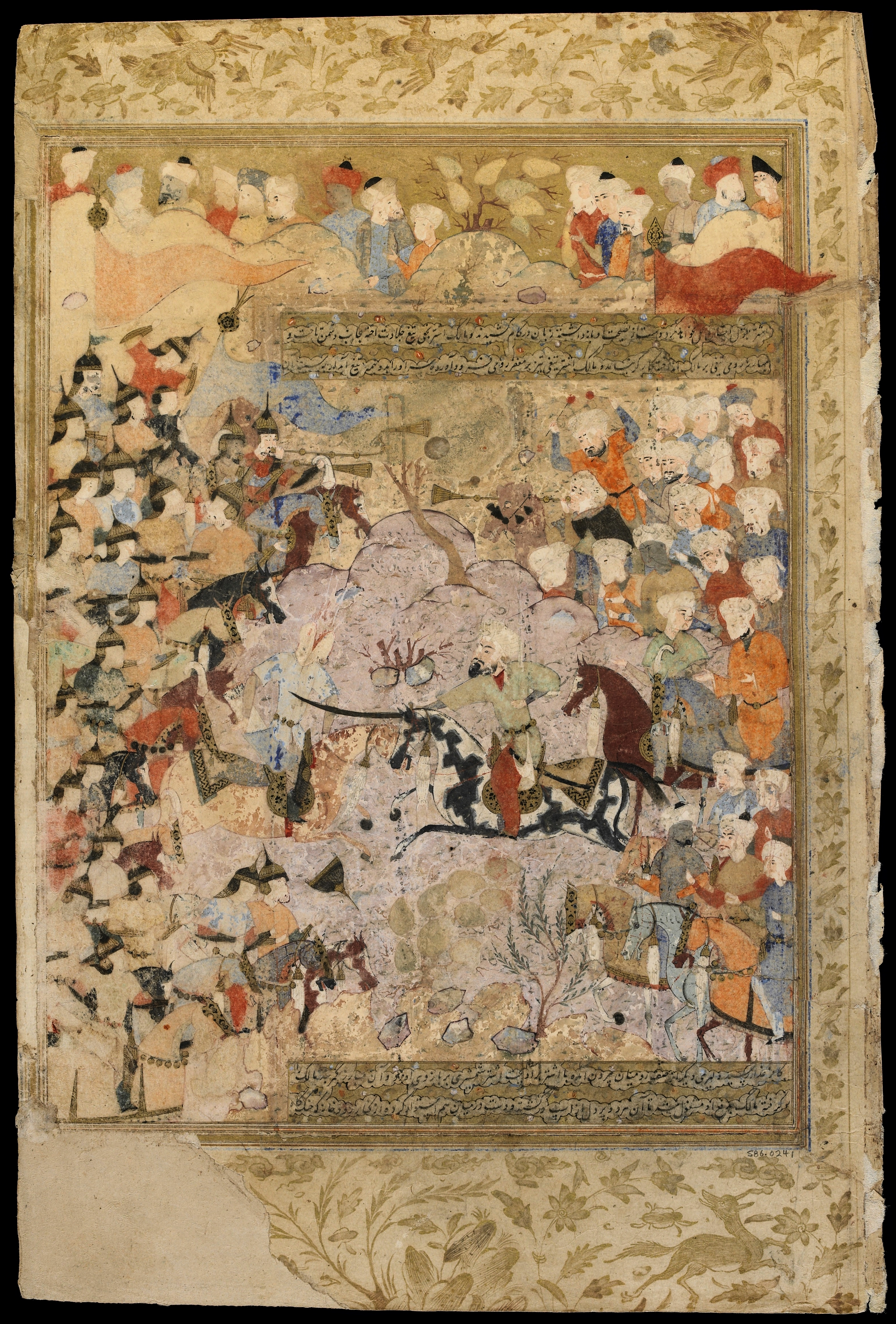
Battle against the Byzantines for Aleppo in 637. Rawdat al-safa (Garden of felicity) by Mirkhwand (d. 1498), Shiraz, 1571-72 (Arthur M. Sackler Collection, S1986.241).

Khalid is truly the commander, May Allah have mercy upon Abu Bakr. He was a better judge of men than I have been.

Abu Ubayda soon joined Khalid at the virtually impregnable fort of Chalcis, which surrendered in June 637. With this strategic victory, the territory north of Chalcis lay open to the Muslims. Khalid and Abu Ubayda continued their march northward and laid siege to Aleppo, which was captured after fierce resistance from desperate Byzantine troops in October 637. The next objective was the splendid city of Antioch, the capital of the Asian zone of the Byzantine Empire.

Before marching towards Antioch, Khalid and Abu Ubayda decided to isolate the city. Accordingly, they sent detachments north to eliminate all possible Byzantine forces and captured the garrison town of Azaz, 50 km (31 mi) from Aleppo. From there the Muslims attacked Antioch on the eastern side. A desperate battle was fought between the Muslim army and the defenders of Antioch, popularly known as Battle of the Iron Bridge. The Byzantine army was composed of the survivors of Yarmuk and other Syrian campaigns. After being defeated, the Byzantines retreated to Antioch and the Muslims besieged the city. Having little hope of help from Emperor Heraclius, Antioch surrendered on 30 October 637, with the terms that all Byzantine troops would be given safe passage to Constantinople.

Abu Ubayda sent Khalid northwards, while he marched south and captured Lazkia, Jabla, Tartus and the coastal areas west of Anti-Lebanon Mountains. Khalid moved north and raided territory up to the Kızıl River (Kızılırmak) in Anatolia. Emperor Heraclius had already left Antioch for Edessa before the arrival of the Muslims. He arranged for the necessary defences in Al-Jazira and Armenia and left for his capital, Constantinople. On his way to Constantinople he had a narrow escape when Khalid, after the capturing Marash, was heading south towards Manbij. Heraclius hastily took the mountainous path and, passing through the Cilician Gates, is reported to have said:

Farewell, a long farewell to Syria, my fair province. Thou art an infidel's now. Peace be with you, O' Syria – what a beautiful land you will be for the enemy hands.

=== Campaigns in Armenia and Anatolia ===
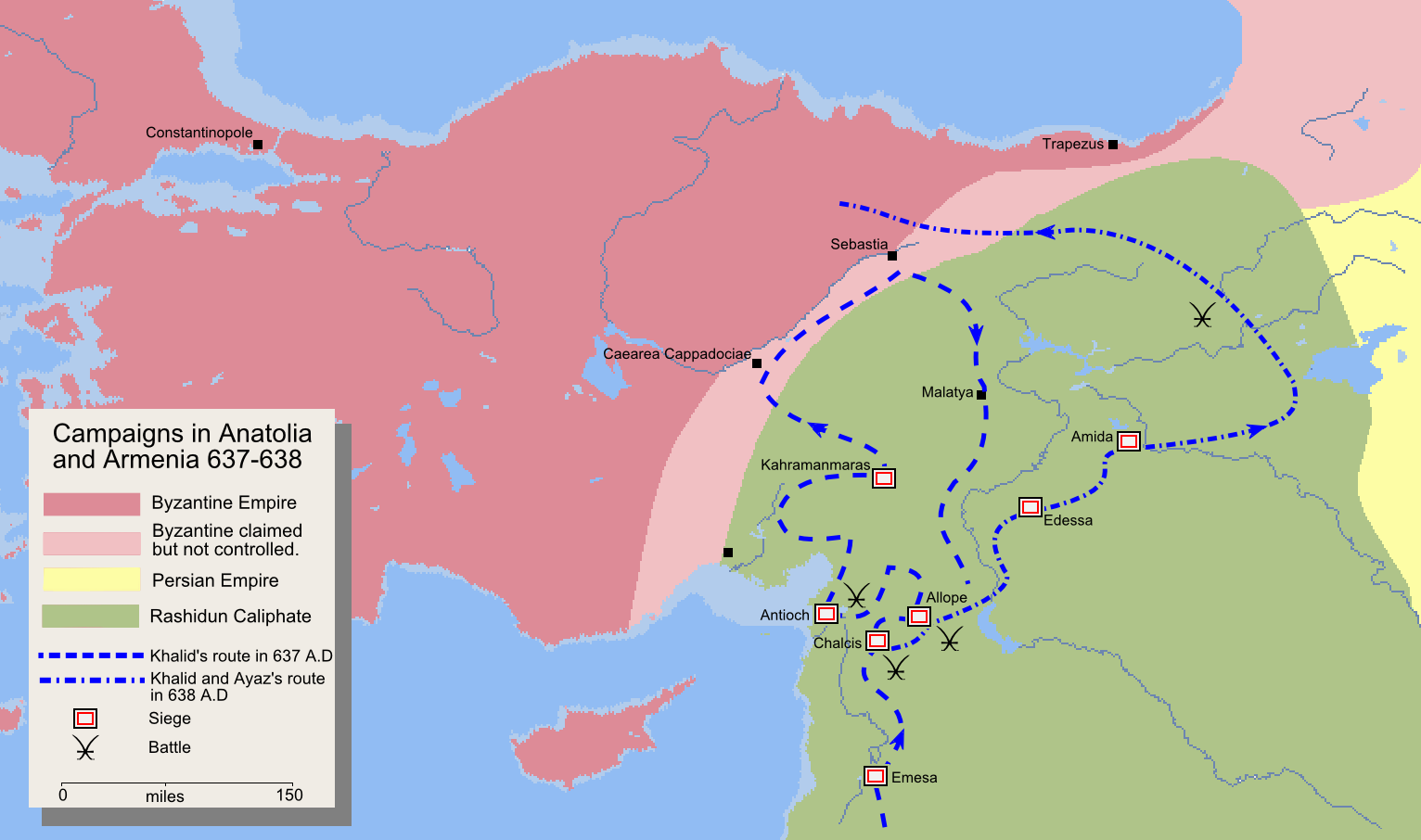
Map detailing the route of Khalid ibn al-Walid's invasion of Syria.

After the battle Umar ordered the conquest of Al-Jazira, which was completed by late summer 638. Following the victory, Abu Ubayda sent Khalid and Iyad ibn Ghanm (conqueror of Al-Jazira) to invade the Byzantine territory north of Al-Jazira. They marched independently and captured Edessa, Amida (Diyarbakır), Malatya and whole of Armenia up to Ararat and raided northern and central Anatolia. Heraclius had already abandoned all the forts between Antioch and Tartus to create a buffer zone or no man's land between Muslim controlled areas and mainland Anatolia.

Umar for the time being stopped his armies from invading invasion deeper into Anatolia. Rather, he ordered Abu Ubayda, now the governor of Syria, to consolidate his rule in Syria. At this point, Umar is reported to have said:

I wish there was a wall of fire between us and Romans, so that they could not enter our territory nor we could enter theirs.

The expedition to Anatolia and Armenia marked the end of the military career of Khalid. Due to the dismissal of Khalid from the army and a famine and plague the next year, the Muslim armies were kept from invading Anatolia.

== Relief efforts during the 638 famine ==
During 638 Arabia fell into a severe drought, with many people perishing from hunger and epidemic diseases. A large number of people from throughout Arabia gathered in Medina as food was being rationed. Soon, Medina's food reserves declined to alarming levels. Caliph Umar wrote to the governors of his provinces requesting aid. One such letter was rushed to Abu Ubayda, who responded promptly:

I am sending you the Caravans whose one end will be here at Syria and the other will be at Madinah.

True to his assurance, Abu Ubayda's caravans of food supplies were the first to reach Medina, with 4,000 camels arriving loaded with food. To handle the distribution of all the food, Umar appointed Abu Ubayda to distribute the food among the thousands of people living in the outskirts of Medina. Following Abu Ubayda's generous aid and coordination of the relief efforts, Umar provided 4,000 dinars as a modest stipend or token of appreciation which Abu Ubayda refused on the grounds that the deed was done for the sake of God.

== Death and burial ==
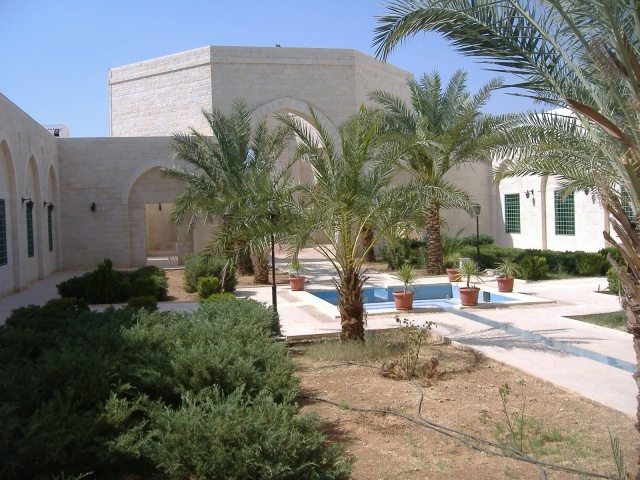
Courtyard of the Mausoleum of Abu Ubayda in Jordan

Abu Ubayda died of the plague in 639 and left no descendants. Beginning in the 13th century, Abu Ubayda's tomb was traditionally held to be in the village of Ammata in the Jordan Valley area of Transjordan. That part of the valley became known 'Ghawr Abi Ubayda'. Earlier places where Abu Ubayda and his wife were said to have been buried were Tiberias and Beisan in the Jordan district (corresponding to the Galilee and its environs). The traveller al-Harawi, who visited the tomb in Ammata at the beginning of the 13th century, mentions that his tomb was shown to be in all three places.

The Jarrahs, the family that traditionally maintained the tomb, claimed descent from Abu Ubayda, and were exempt by the Ottoman authorities from paying taxes. They had a waqf on the property and collected donations to Abu Ubayda's memory from farmers and traders at the market nearest the tomb.

== See also ==
- 7th century in Lebanon § Ṣaḥāba who have visited Lebanon
- List of Sahabah
- List of expeditions of Muhammad

== Bibliography ==
- Athamina, Khalil (July 1994). "The Appointment and Dismissal of Khālid b. al-Walīd from the Supreme Command: A Study of the Political Strategy of the Early Muslim Caliphs in Syria". Arabica. 41 (2). Brill: 253–272. doi:10.1163/157005894X00191. JSTOR 4057449.
- Donner, Fred M. (1981). The Early Islamic Conquests. Princeton: Princeton University Press. ISBN 0-691-05327-8.
- Fischbach, Michael R. (2000). State, Society, and Land in Jorda. Leiden, Boston and Koln: Brill. ISBN 90-04-11912-4.
- Kathir, Ibn (18 October 2017). The Sword of Allah: Khalid Bin Al-Waleed, His Life and Campaigns. American Eagle Animal Rescue. ISBN 978-1-948117-27-2.
- Sharon, Moshe (2018). "Witnessed by Three Disciples of the Prophet: The Jerusalem 32 Inscription from 32 AH/652 CE". Israel Exploration Journal. 68 (1): 100–111. JSTOR 26740639.
- Shoufani, Elias S. (1973). Al-Riddah and the Muslim Conquest of Arabia. Toronto: University of Toronto Press. ISBN 0-8020-1915-3.
- Gibb, H. A. R. (1960). "Abū ʿUbayda b. al-Jarraḥ". In Gibb, H. A. R.; Kramers, J. H.; Lévi-Provençal, E.; Schacht, J.; Lewis, B. & Pellat, Ch. (eds.). The Encyclopaedia of Islam, Second Edition. Volume I: A–B. Leiden: E. J. Brill. pp. 158–159. OCLC 495469456.
- Gordon, Matthew S.; Robinson, Chase F.; Rowson, Everett K.; Fishbein, Michael, eds. (2018). The Works of Ibn Wāḍiḥ al-Yaʿqūbī: An English Translation. Vol. 2. Brill. ISBN 978-90-04-36416-5.
- Athamina, Khalil (2007). "Abū ʿUbayda b. al-Jarrāḥ". In Fleet, Kate; Krämer, Gudrun; Matringe, Denis; Nawas, John; Rowson, Everett (eds.). Encyclopaedia of Islam (3rd ed.). Brill Online. ISSN 1873-9830.
- Tehrani, Hamid (2015). "Abū ʿUbayda b. al-Jarrāḥ". In Madelung, Wilferd; Daftary, Farhad (eds.). Encyclopaedia Islamica. Brill Online. doi:10.1163/1875-9831_isla_SIM_0229. ISSN 1875-9831.
- Ibn Ishaq, Muhammad (2004). The Life of Muhammad: A Translation of Ishaq's Sirat Rasul Allah. Translated by Guillaume, Alfred. Oxford University Press. ISBN 0-19-636033-1.
- Ibn Sa'd, Muhammad (2013). Kitāb al-Ṭabaqāt al-Kabīr: The Companions of Badr. Vol. 3. Translated by Aisha Bewley. London: Ta-Ha Publishers. ISBN 978-1842001332.
- Abdul-Rahman, Muhammad Saed (2009). Tafsir Ibn Kathir Juz' 28: Al-Mujadila 1 to At-Tahrim 12. Vol. 28 (2nd ed.). MSA Publication Limited. ISBN 978-1861797544.
- Fishbein, Michael, ed. (1997). The History of al-Ṭabarī, Volume VIII: The Victory of Islam: Muḥammad at Medina A.D. 626–630/A.H. 5–8. SUNY Series in Near Eastern Studies. Albany, New York: State University of New York Press. ISBN 978-0-7914-3149-8.
- Poonawala, Ismail, ed. (1990). The History of al-Ṭabarī, Volume IX: The Last Years of the Prophet: The Formation of the State, A.D. 630–632/A.H. 8–11. SUNY Series in Near Eastern Studies. Albany, New York: State University of New York Press. ISBN 978-0-88706-691-7.
- Ayoub, Mahmoud (2013). The Qur'an and Its Interpreters: Volume 2: Surah 3. Vol. 2. Islamic Book Trust. ISBN 978-9675062919.
- al-Waqidi, Muhammad ibn Umar (2011). The Life of Muhammad: Wāqidī’s Kitāb al-Maghāzī. Translated by Faizer, Rizwi; Ismail, Amal; Tayob, Abd al-Kader. Routledge. ISBN 978-0-415-57434-1.
- Bowker, John, ed. (1997). "Abū ʿUbaida b. al-Djarraḥ". The Oxford Dictionary of World Religions. Oxford: Oxford University Press. p. 14. ISBN 0-19-213965-7. OCLC 896422819.
