= Mosque of Abu Ubaidah Amer ibn al-Jarrah =

Mosque in Deir Alla, Jordan

- مسجد أبي عبيدة عامر بن الجراح
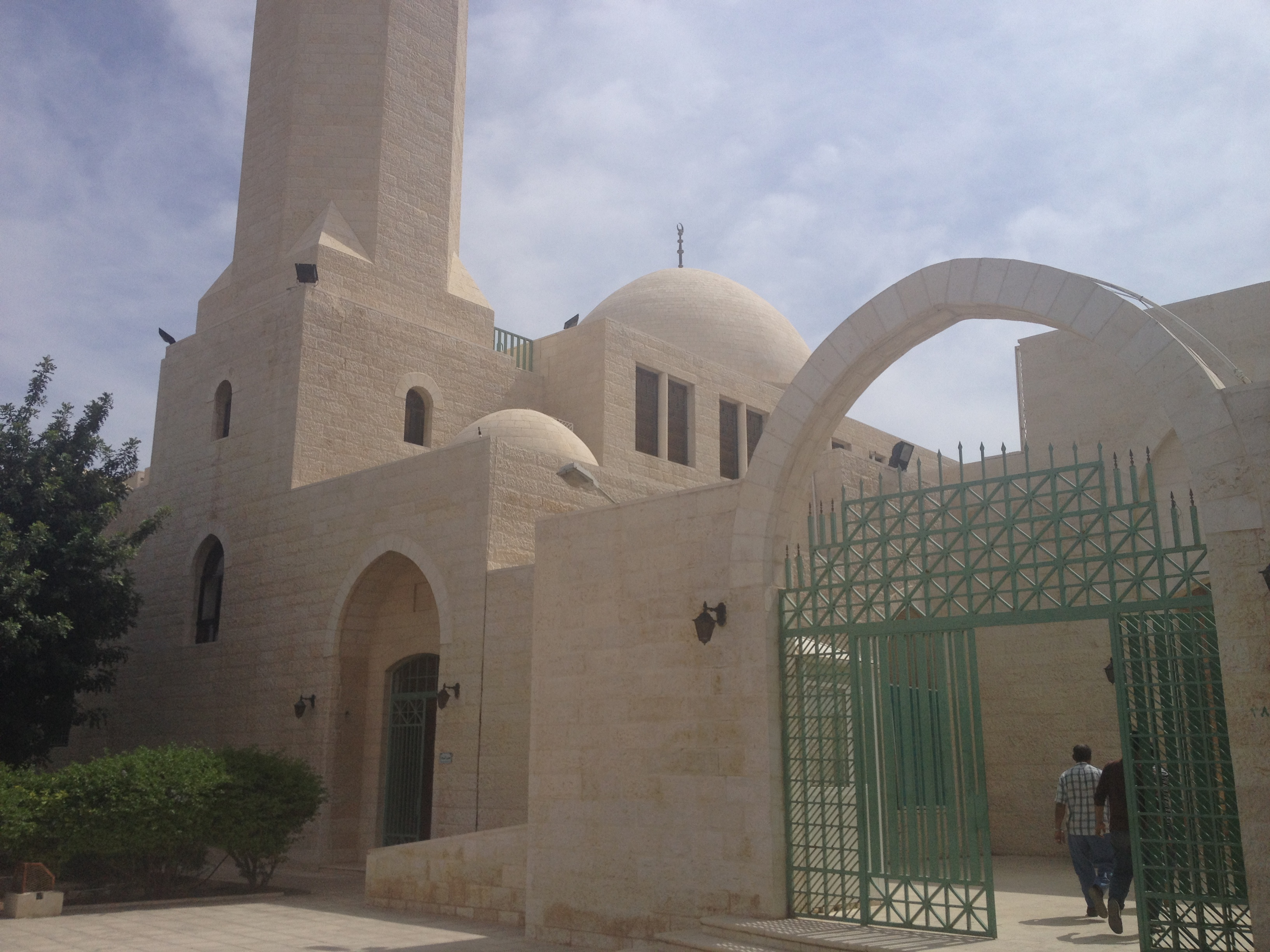
- The rcomplex in 2014

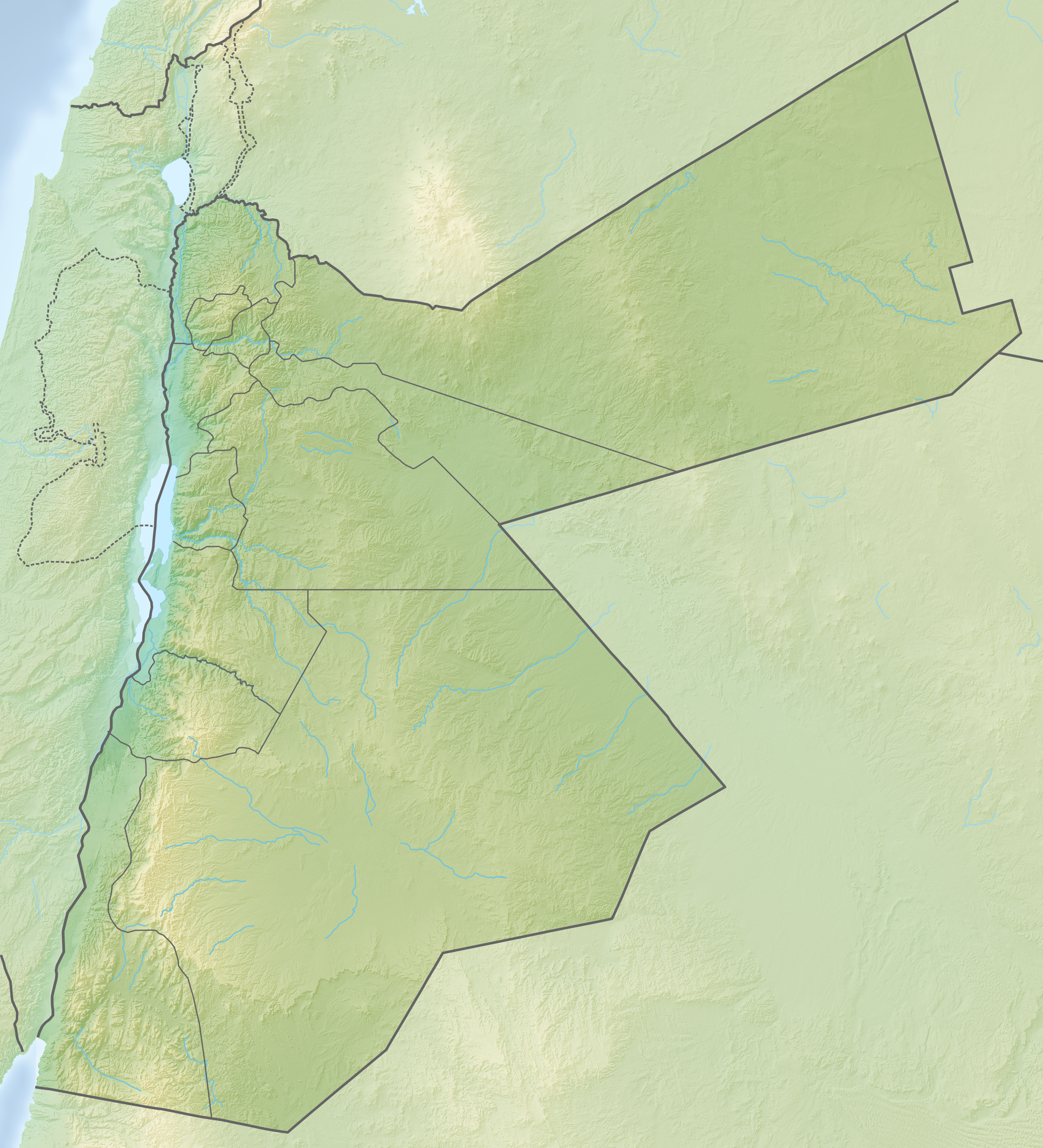
- Location of the complex in Jordan

Religion
- Affiliation: Islam
- Ecclesiastical or organizational status: Mosque; Mausoleum
- Status: Active

Location
- Location: Deir Alla, Balqa Governorate
- Country: Jordan
- Interactive map of Mosque of Abu Ubaidah Amer ibn al-Jarrah
- Coordinates: 32°13′37″N 35°37′10″E

Architecture
- Style: Islamic architecture
- Completed: 13th century (mausoleum); 1954 (mosque)

Specifications
- Capacity: 3,000 worshipers
- Interior area: 6,500 m^{2} (70,000 sq ft)
- Dome: 1
- Minaret: 1
- Shrine: 1: Abu Ubayda ibn al-Jarrah (disputed)

The Mosque of Abu Ubaidah Amer ibn al-Jarrah (Arabic: مسجد أبي عبيدة عامر بن الجراح) is a mosque and mausoleum complex located in the town of Deir Alla, in the governorate of Balqa, Jordan. It contains the purported tomb of Abu Ubayda ibn al-Jarrah, one of the Sahabah and a military commander of the Rashidun Caliphate.

== History ==
Abu Ubayda ibn al-Jarrah died in 639 CE, various sources reported his burial in the territory of what is now present-day Jordan. In the 13th century, Baybars, a Mamluk ruler, erected a domed mausoleum and an attached mosque over the purported grave.

During the rule of the Hashemite Kingdom, in the years 1946 until 1954, the mosque and its adjoining mausoleum were entirely rebuilt into a larger structure, at the request of the Ministry of Jordan. The current structure is modern, and there are inscriptions from the Mamluk period preserved in the mosque structure.

== Architecture ==
The mosque is well known for containing the tomb of the famed military commander it is named after. The complex also includes a library and an Islamic museum. Residences are present for the Imam of the mosque and the muezzin. A multi-purpose hall and an area for the VIP guests is also included in the complex. There is a large cemetery outside the mosque complex, which currently suffers from a shortage of burial plots, due to people wishing to be buried next to a revered figure in their religion.

== Gallery ==
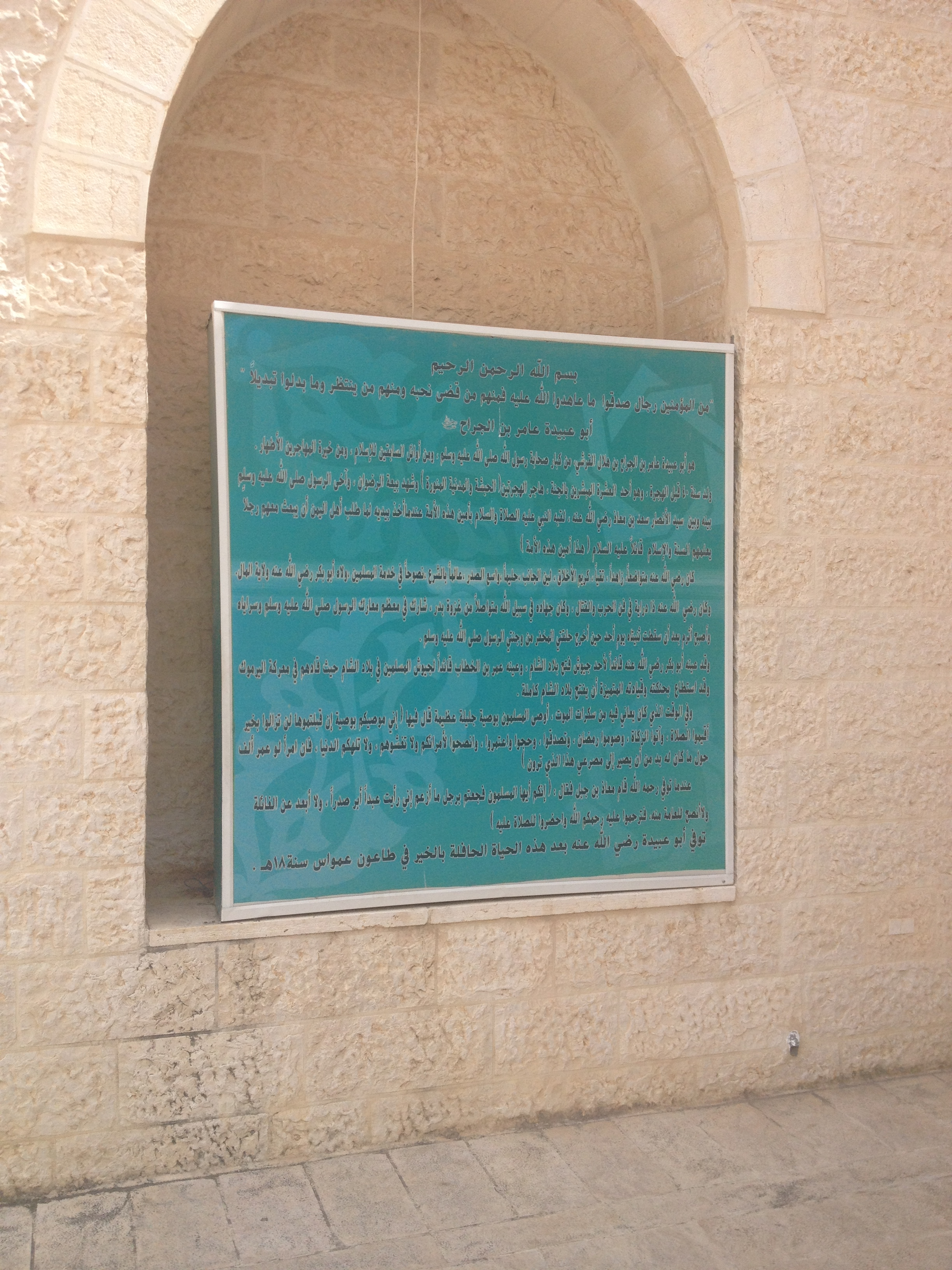
A sign at the entrance, about the life of Abu Ubaidah

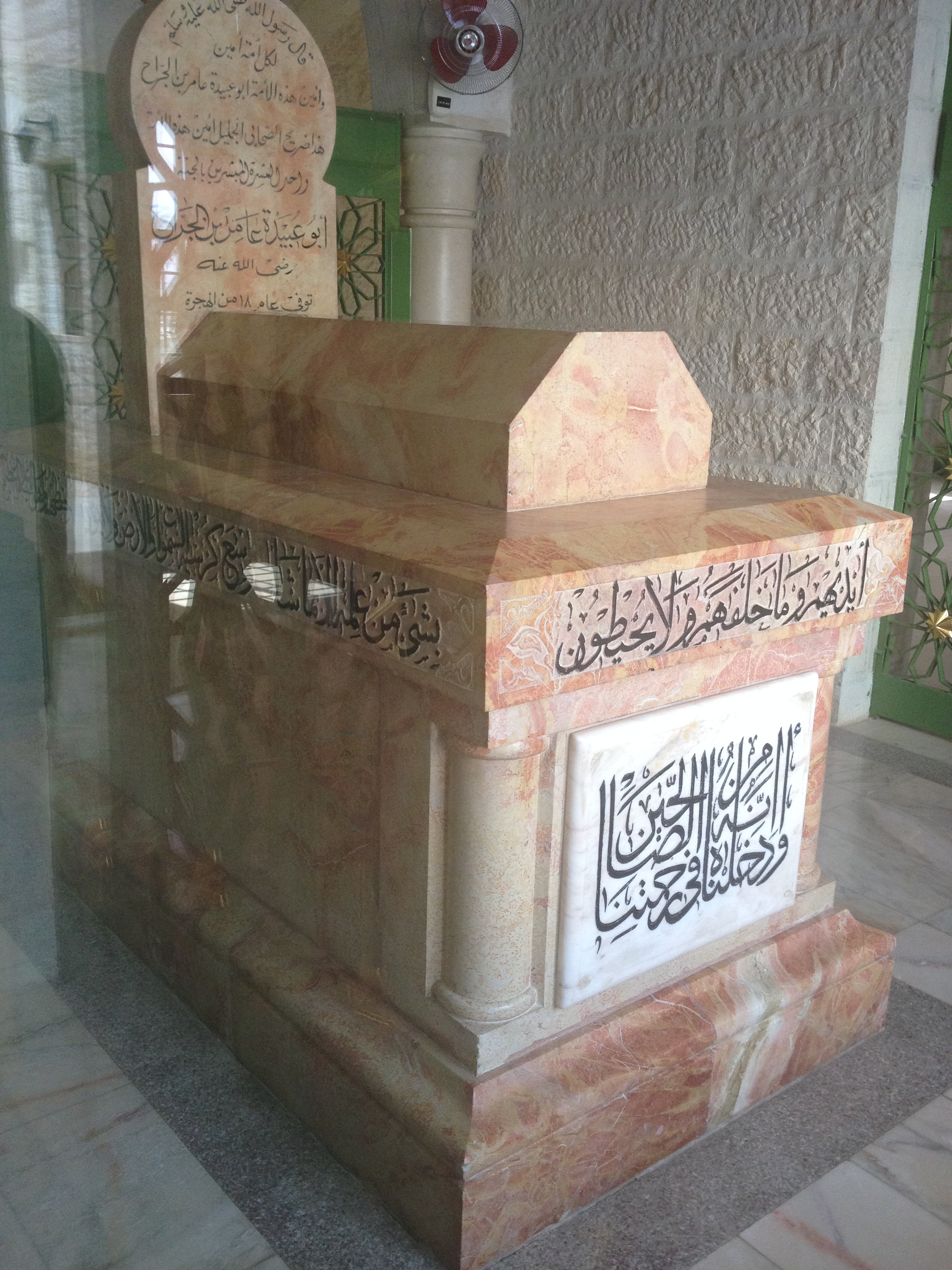
Abu Ubaidah's tomb

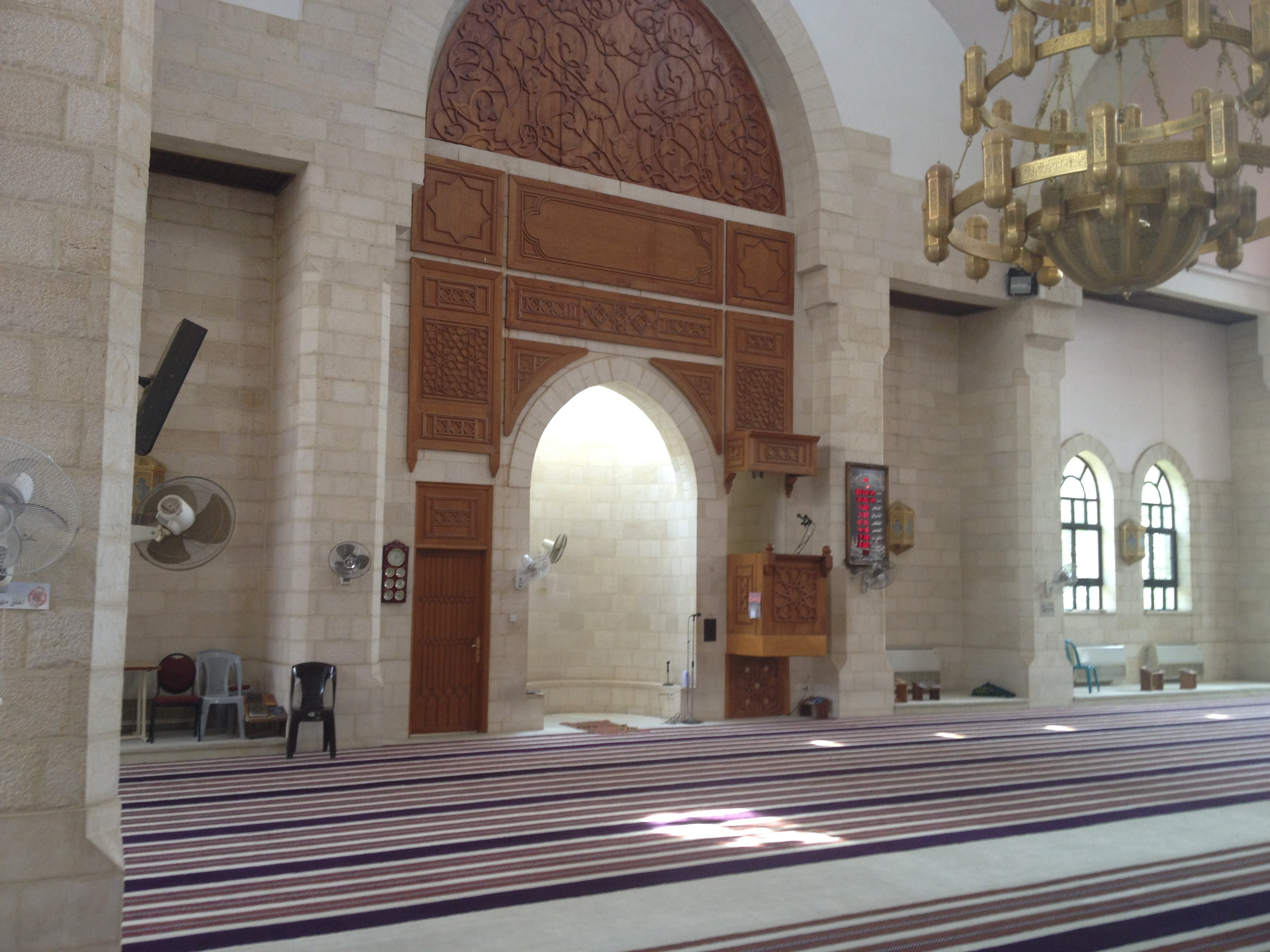
The prayer hall of the mosque

== See also ==
- Islam in Jordan
- List of mosques in Jordan
