= Siege of Damascus (634) =

Part of the Muslim Conquest of Syria

- Part of the Muslim conquest of Syria (Arab–Byzantine wars)
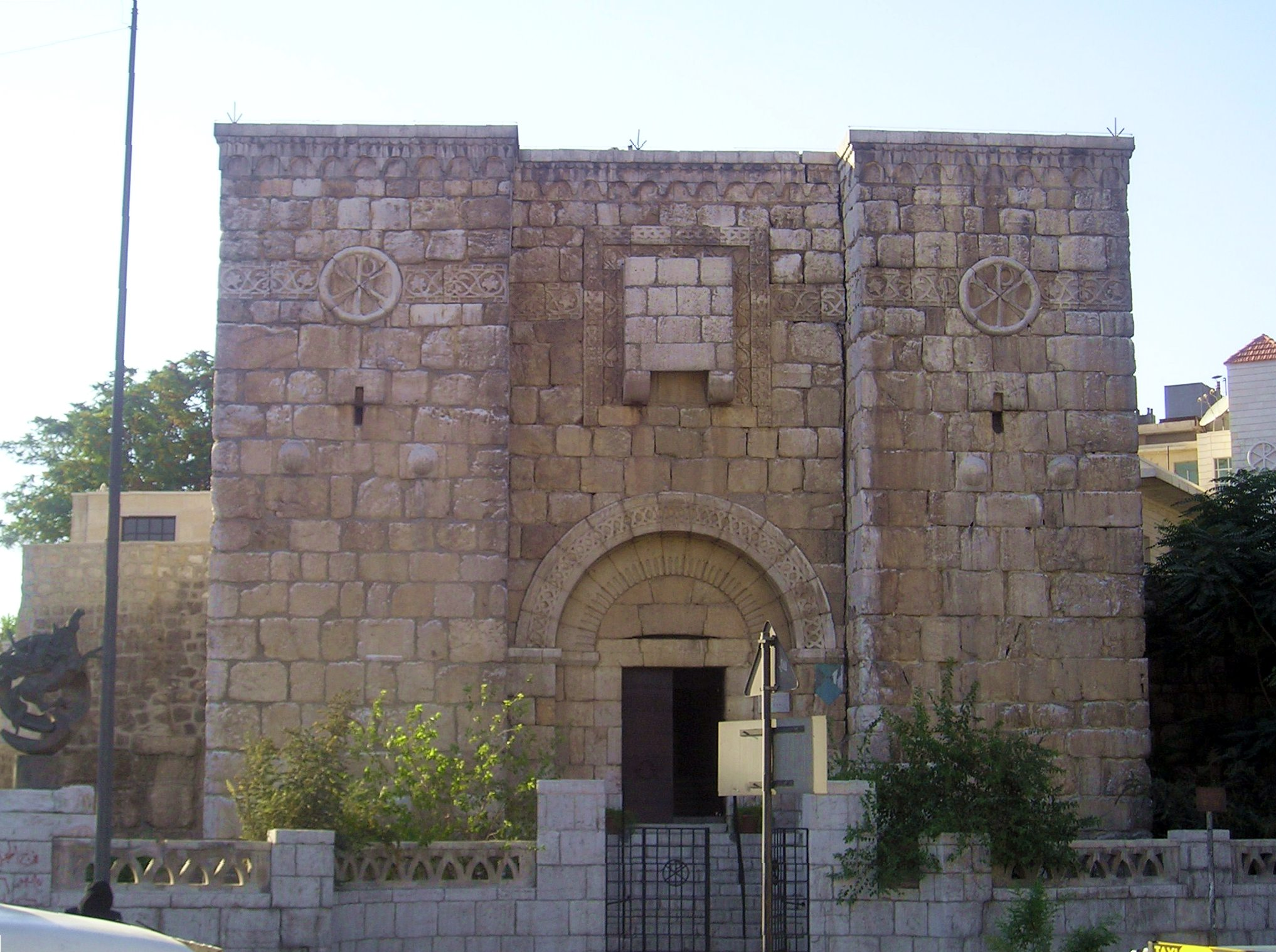
- Kisan Gate, one of the six ancient gates of Damascus.
Date	21 August – 19 September 634 (Note: According to Burns (2007), the siege ended in September 635.)
Location	Damascus, Syria
Result	Rashidun victory
Territorial changes	Damascus captured by the Rashidun Caliphate

Belligerents
Rashidun Caliphate	Byzantine Empire

Commanders and leaders
Khalid ibn al-Walid; Abu Ubayda ibn al-Jarrah; Yazid ibn Abi Sufyan; Amr ibn al-As; Shurahbil ibn Hasana; Mu'awiya ibn Abi Sufyan; Ubadah ibn al-Samit	Thomas

Strength
20,000	15,000–16,000

Casualties and losses
Low	Heavy

The siege of Damascus (634) lasted from 21 August to 19 September 634 before the city fell to the Rashidun Caliphate. Damascus was the first major city of the Eastern Roman Empire to fall in the Muslim conquest of Syria.

The last of the Roman–Persian Wars ended in 628, after Heraclius concluded a successful campaign against the Persians in Mesopotamia. At the same time, Muhammad united the Arabs under the banner of Islam. After his death in 632, Abu Bakr succeeded him as the first caliph. Suppressing several internal revolts, Abu Bakr sought to expand the empire beyond the confines of the Arabian Peninsula.

In April 634, Abu Bakr invaded the Byzantine Empire in the Levant and decisively defeated a Byzantine army at the Battle of Ajnadayn. The Muslim armies marched north and laid siege to Damascus. The city was taken after a bishop informed Khalid ibn al-Walid, the Muslim commander in chief, that it was possible to breach city walls by attacking a position only lightly defended at night. While Khalid entered the city by assault from the Eastern gate, Thomas, commander of the Byzantine garrison, negotiated a peaceful surrender at the Jabiyah gate with Abu Ubayda ibn al-Jarrah, Khalid's second in command. After the surrender of the city, the commanders disputed the terms of the peace agreement. The commanders finally agreed that the peace terms given by Abu Ubayda would be met. The peace terms included an assurance that no pursuit will be undertaken by Muslims against the departing Roman convoy for three days. Having acquiesced to the peace terms, it was three days after the surrender of the city that Khalid set out after the Damascan refugees towards Antioch and defeated them in battle six days later, near present day Al Jayyad.

== Background ==
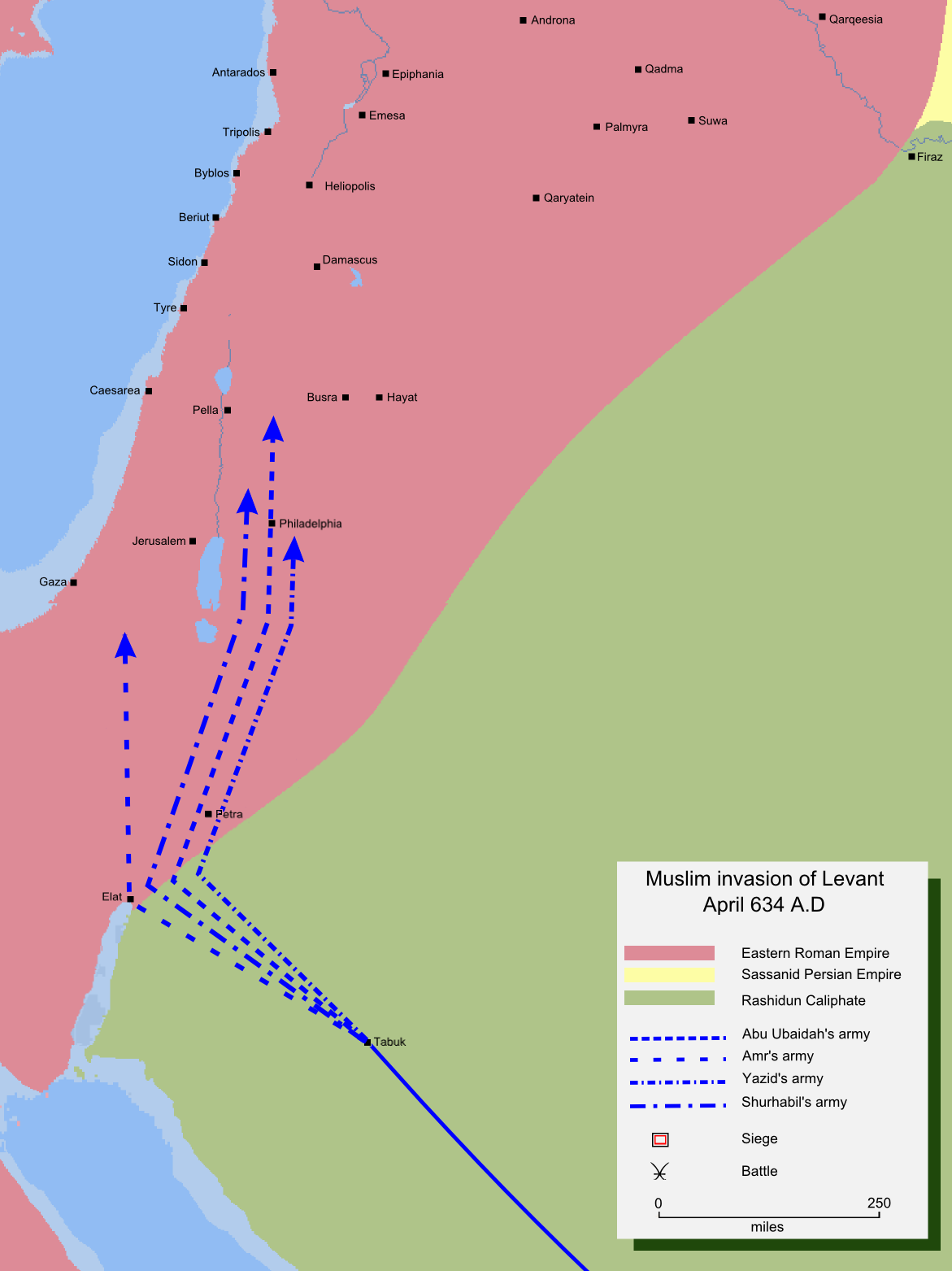
Map detailing the Rashidun Caliphate's invasion of Levant

In 610, during the Byzantine–Sasanian War of 602–628, Heraclius became the emperor of the Byzantine Empire after overthrowing Phocas. While Heraclius focused his attention on the internal affairs of his empire, the Sassanid Persians conquered Mesopotamia, overran Syria in 611, and entered Anatolia to occupy Caesarea Mazaca. In 612, Heraclius expelled the Persians from Anatolia. In 613, he launched a counter offensive against Syria, but was decisively defeated.

Over the next decade, the Persians conquered Palestine and Egypt and Heraclius rebuilt his army, preparing for a new offensive, which he launched in 622. He achieved substantial victories over the Persians and their allies in the Caucasus and Armenia. In 627, he launched a daring winter offensive against Persia in Mesopotamia, and won a decisive victory at the Battle of Nineveh. This victory threatened the Persian capital city of Ctesiphon.

Discredited by this series of disasters, Khosrow II was killed in a coup led by his son Kavad II, who at once sued for peace, agreeing to withdraw from all occupied territories of the Byzantine empire. Heraclius restored the True Cross to Jerusalem with an elaborate ceremony in 629.

In Arabia, Muhammad had united most of Arabia under a single religious and political authority. When Muhammad died in June 632, Abu Bakr was elected to the newly formed office of Caliph, becoming Muhammad's political and religious successor as the first Rashidun caliph. Several Arabic tribes revolted against Abu Bakr. In the Ridda Wars (Note: Arabic: حُرُوب الرِّدَّة, romanized: ḥurūb ar-riddah, lit. 'Apostasy wars'), Abu Bakr quelled the revolt. By 633, Arabia was firmly united under the central authority of the Caliph in Medina. In 633, Abu Bakr initiated a war of conquest against the neighboring Sassanian and Byzantine empires. After a successful conquest of the Persian province of Iraq, Abu Bakr's confidence grew and in April 634 his armies invaded the Byzantine Levant from four different routes. These armies proved to be too small for the task, necessitating reinforcements from Iraq, led by Abu Bakr's capable general Khalid ibn al-Walid Crossing the desert, Khalid ibn al-Walid entered Syria from an unexpected route in a bold move. He attacked and overthrew the Byzantine defenses of Levant and quickly captured the Ghassanid capital city of Bosra. In July, the Muslim army under Khalid's command defeated another Byzantine army in the Battle of Ajnadayn. After clearing their southern flank, the Muslims laid siege to Damascus.

=== Siege site ===
Strategically located, Damascus attracted merchants from all over the world. The city was known as the paradise of Syria.

The fortifications matched its importance. The main part of the city was enclosed by a massive 11 m (36 ft) high wall. (Note: Damascus City has risen 4 metres since then, so that the wall is now only 7 metres above ground level (See Akram (2004), pg.294.)) The fortified city was approximately 1,500 m (4,900 ft) long and 800 m (2,600 ft) wide.

The wall had six gates:

- The East Gate (Bab Sharqi)
- The Gate of Thomas (Bab Touma)
- The Jabiya Gate (Bab al-Jabiya)
- The Gate of Paradise (Bab al-Faradis)
- The Keisan Gate (Bab Kisan)
- The Small Gate (Bab al-Saghir) (Note: See The walls and gates of Damascus.)

Although the River Barada ran along the north wall of Damascas, it was too shallow to be of defensive importance. At the time of the Syrian campaign, the Byzantine Commander of Damascus was Thomas, son-in-law of Emperor Heraclius. (Note: According to Edward Gibbon: "Vanity prompted the Arabs to believe, that Thomas was the son-in-law of the emperor. We know the children of Heraclius by his two wives: and his august daughter would not have married in exile at Damascus (see du Cange, Historia Byzantina Familiae Byzantinae. p. 118–119.) Had he been less religious, I might only suspect the legitimacy of the damsel.") A devout Christian, he was known for his courage and skill at command, and also for his intelligence and learning.

== Dispositions ==
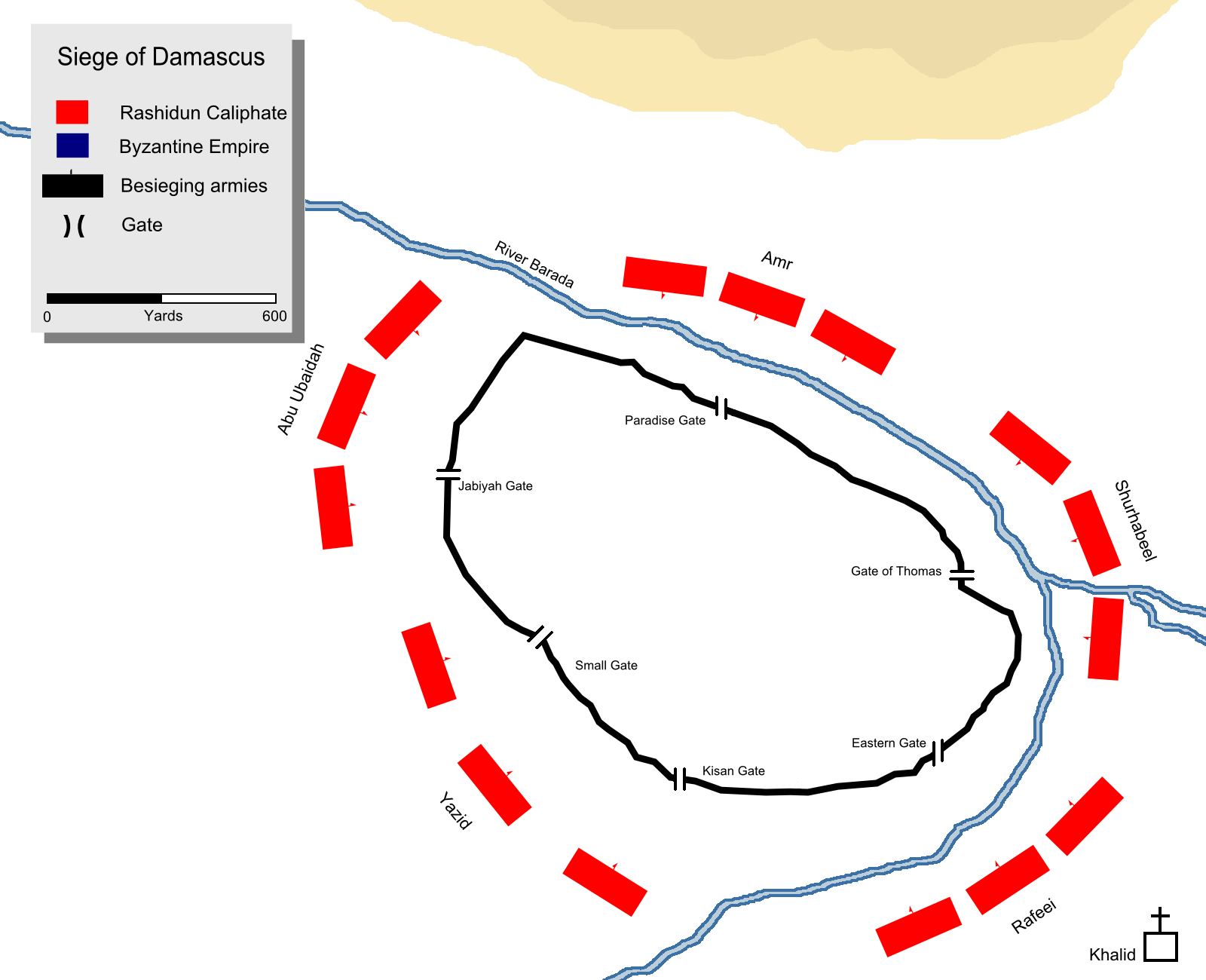
Muslim troop deployment (Red) during the siege of Damascus

Without the necessary siege equipment, armies of the early Muslim expansion would surround a city, denying it supplies until the city's defenders surrendered. Meanwhile any chance of breaking into the city would be availed, if possible, using stealth and espionage. Muslim armies would usually isolate the city from the rest of the region and deploy scouts along vital routes.

Before the siege of Damascus, Khalid isolated it from the rest of the northern Syria. To the west, a detachment of cavalry at Fahal occupied the attention of the Byzantine garrison. This detachment also protected the Muslim supply lines to Medina. Thus this cavalry detachment functioned as the rearguard of the Muslim forces on the Syrian front. Another detachment was sent on the road to Emesa to take up a position near Bait Lihya, approximately 10 miles (16 km) from the city. Its instructions were to reconnoiter for any Byzantine relief columns. If unable to defeat or repel a Byzantine rescue effort, the detachment commander was instructed to send for reinforcements from Khalid.

Having isolated Damascus, Khalid ordered his army to surround the city on 21 August (the 20th of Jumada al-Akhira, 13 Hijri). The corps commanders were instructed to repel any Byzantine offensive from the respective gates and seek assistance in case of heavy attack. Dirar ibn al-Azwar commanded 2.000 horsemen from the mobile guard to patrol in the empty area between the gates at night and to reinforce any corps attacked by the Byzantines.

The following Muslim generals held the siege of the six gates of the Damascus. Each commander at the gate had 4,000–5,000 forces under his command:

- Gate of Thomas: Shurahbil
- Jabiya Gate: Abu Ubayda
- Gate of Faradis: Amr
- Keisan Gate: Yazid
- Small Gate: Yazid
- Eastern Gate: Rafi ibn Umayr.

Khalid placed the main body of his forces under the command of Rafi ibn Umayr at the eastern gate. He established his headquarters a short distance away from the eastern gate in a monastery, known since then as Deir al Khalid, the monastery of Khalid. Khalid's army had encircled the city, halting the flow of supplies into Damascus while the Ghouta of Damascus provided the Muslim army with all the supplies Khalid needed for his men and their mounts.

=== Byzantine relief ===
Emperor Heraclius was at Antioch at the beginning of the siege and on 9 September, he dispatched a relief force, thought to have numbered around 12,000 men. Scouts posted on the road from Emesa to Damascus reported the approach of a Byzantine army. Upon hearing this news, Khalid sent Rafi ibn Umayr with 5,000 troops. They met 20 miles (32 km) north of Damascus at Uqab Pass (Eagle Pass) on the Damascus-Emesa road. That force proved insufficient and was soon surrounded by the Byzantine troops. However before the Byzantines could defeat the Muslim detachment, Khalid arrived with another column of 4,000 men and routed them. It has since come to be known as Battle of the pass of Uqab.

The Muslim siege forces had been weakened by the withdrawal of 9,000 men to repel the Byzantine relief force. If the Byzantine garrison had sallied out against the Muslim army, historians suspect the defenders would have broken through the Muslim lines and lifted the siege. Understanding the danger of the situation, Khalid hurriedly returned to Damascus.

=== First Byzantine attack ===
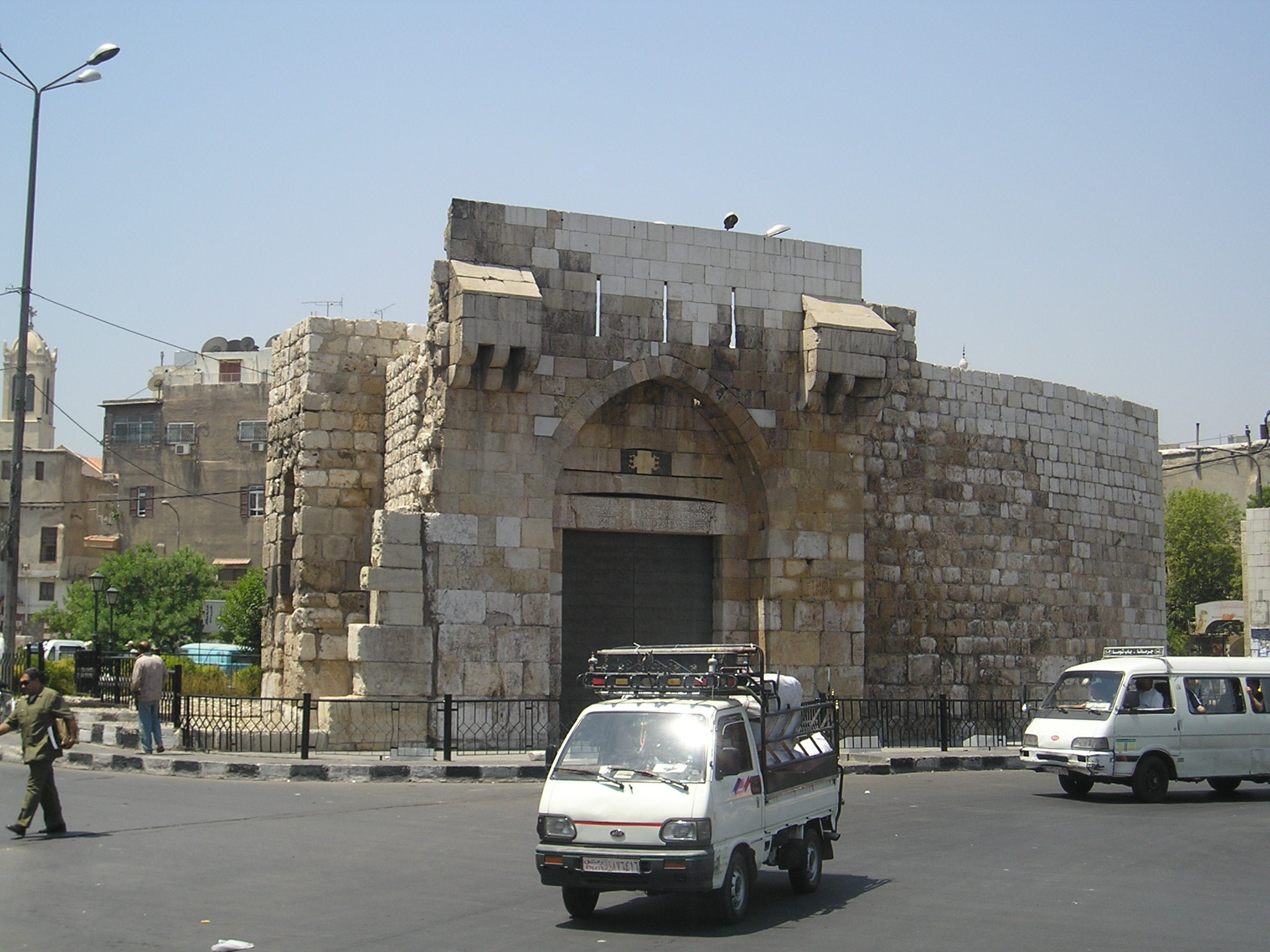
Wall of Damascus at the Thomas gate. Although now only 7 metres (23 feet) high, it was 11 m (36 ft) high at the time of the siege. Damascus has risen 4 m (13 ft) since then.

After realizing that no reinforcements would come, Thomas decided to launch a counter offensive. Early in the third week of September, Thomas drew men from all sectors of the city to form a force strong enough to break through the Gate of Thomas. He was there faced by Shurahbil with his corps of about 5,000 men. The Byzantine attack began with a concentrated shower of arrows against the Muslims. The Byzantine infantry, covered by the archers on the wall, rushed through the gate and fanned out into battle formation. Thomas himself led the assault. During this action, Thomas was struck in his right eye by an arrow. Unsuccessful in breaking the Muslim lines, the Byzantines retreated back to the fortress. The wounded Thomas is said to have sworn to take a thousand eyes in return. He ordered another great sortie for that night.

=== Second Byzantine attack ===
This time Thomas planned to launch simultaneous sorties from four gates. The main sector was to be again the Thomas gate, to take full advantage of the exhausted Muslim corps stationed there. The attacks from the other gates—Jabiya Gate, the Small Gate and the Eastern Gate—were intended to tie down the other Muslim corps so that they could not aid Shurhabil's corps at the Thomas gate.

At the Eastern Gate, Thomas assembled more forces than at the other gates, so that Khalid would be unable to move to Shurahbil's assistance and take command in that decisive sector. Thomas' attack at several gates also gave more flexibility to the operation: if success were achieved in any sector other than the Gate of Thomas, such success could be exploited by sending troops to that sector to achieve the breakthrough. Thomas ordered Khalid to be taken alive.

After some hard fighting at the Jabiya Gate, commander Abu Ubayda and his men repulsed the sally and the Byzantines hastened back to the city. The battle was intense at the Small Gate, which was guarded by commander Yazid and his men. Yazid had fewer troops but Dharar came to Yazid's aid with his 2,000 cavalry of the Mobile Guard. The cavalry attacked the flank of the Byzantine sortie force and repulsed the sally.

At the East Gate, the situation also became serious, for a larger Byzantine force had been assigned to this sector. Rafay was unable to withstand their attacks. The timely arrival of Khalid with his reserve of 400 veteran cavalry and his subsequent attack on the Roman flank marked the turning point in the sally at the Eastern Gate.

The heaviest fighting occurred at the Thomas gate, where Thomas again commanded the sally in person. After intense fighting, Thomas, seeing that there was no weakening in the Muslim front, decided that continuing the attack would be fruitless and would lead to even heavier casualties among his men. He ordered a withdrawal and the Romans moved back at a steady pace, during which they were subjected to a concentrated shower of arrows by the Muslims. This was the last attempt by Thomas to break the siege. The attempt had failed. He had lost thousands of men in these sallies, and could no longer afford to fight outside the walls of the city.

== Khalid's attack ==
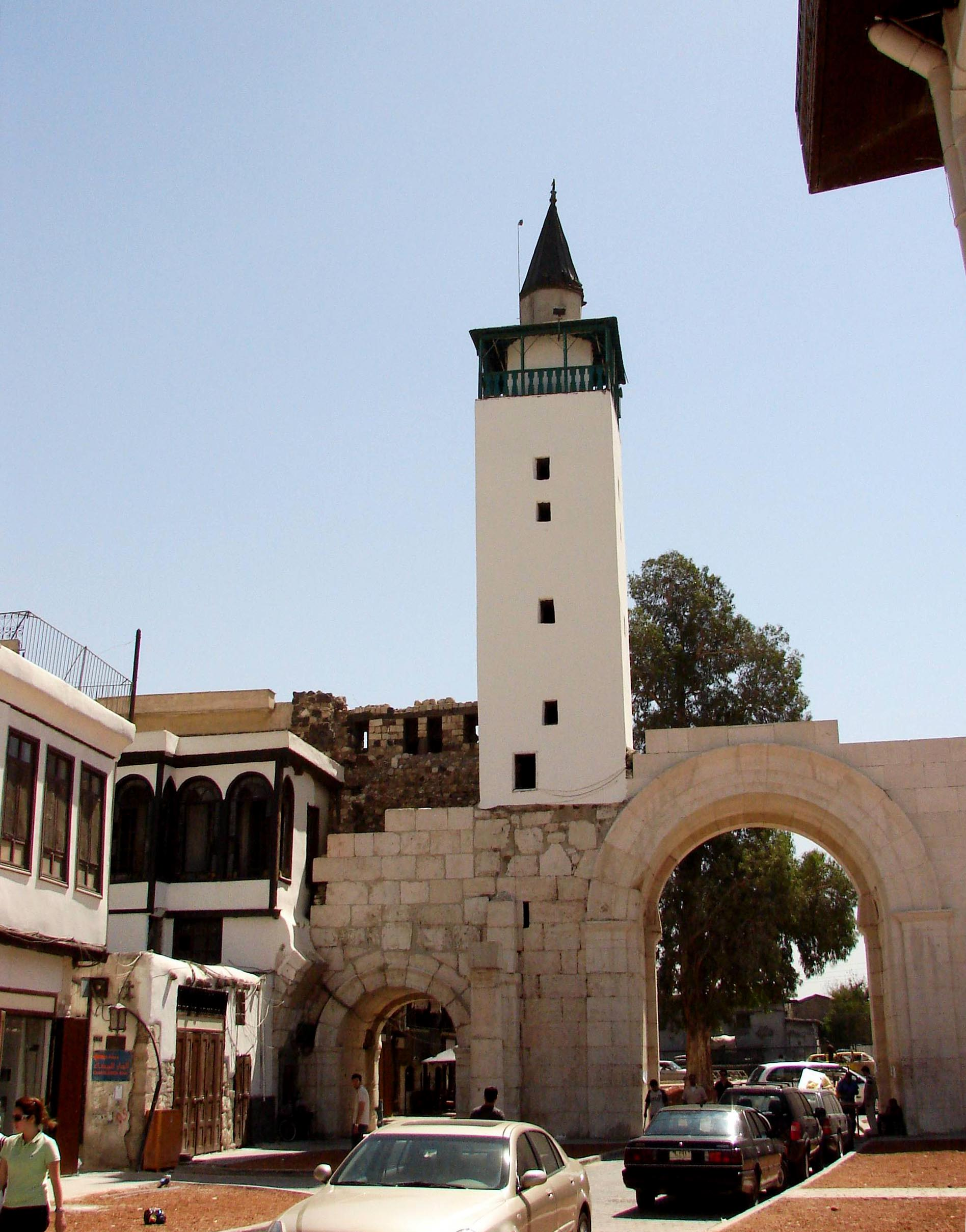
Remains of the Eastern gate. Khalid's troops entered Damascus through this gate.

On 18 September, a priest named Jonah informed Khalid about a festival celebration in the city that night. (Note: It is not clear which festival it was, some early Muslim sources says it was a celebration of the birth of son to the high priest of Damascus (Al-Waqidi, p.46)) The festivities offered Khalid an opportunity to capture the city in a surprise attack on the relatively lightly defended walls. In return, Jonah requested immunity for himself and his fiance. According to Muslim chronicles, she was still not handed over to him because of the arrival of the Muslim army that was to besiege Damascus, and according to the narrations he came to Khalid with this information only to get his wife sooner. Jonah also converted to Islam.

With no time to make a coordinated plan of attack for the whole army, Khalid decided to storm the East Gate himself. He, Qa'qa ibn Amr, and Mazur ibn Adi climbed the wall hand-by-hand from the side of the gate. This part of the wall was the strongest, no guard was stationed at the top. They secured ropes to the wall and dropped them to 100 selected soldiers waiting at the base. Leaving a few men to assist the climbers, Khalid descended into the city, killing the guards at the inside of the East Gate. Khalid and Qa'qa flung the gate open and the remainder of Khalid's men entered the city. An intense battle ensued.

When Thomas saw that the rest of the army did not move from the other gates, he assumed first that only Khalid's army had entered the city and second that the other corps commanders were unaware of the breach in the defenses. Thomas tried to save Damascus for one last time. He sent envoys to the Jabiya Gate to talk with Abu Ubayda , the second in command to Khalid, and offered to surrender the fort peacefully and to pay the Jizya. Abu Ubayda, who was well known for his peace-loving nature, accepted the terms, thinking that Khalid would also agree.

The news was sent to all the corps commanders. After dawn Abu Ubayda entered Damascus from Jabiyah gate and the other commanders from their respective gates, while Khalid's corps was still battling in the city from the East Gate. Abu Ubayda marched peacefully with his corps, accompanied by Thomas, Harbees, several dignitaries, and the bishops of Damascus, toward the center of city. From the East Gate, Khalid and his men fought their way towards the center of Damascus, killing all who resisted. The commanders met at the Mariamite Cathedral of Damascus in the center of the city.

=== Capture of the city ===
Khalid argued that he had conquered the city by force. Abu Ubayda maintained the city had capitulated, through the peace agreement between him and Thomas. The corps commanders discussed the situation, and reportedly told Khalid that the peace agreement must be honoured, which Khalid agreed to although reluctantly.

The terms of the peace agreement were that no one would be enslaved, no harm would be done to the temples, nothing would be taken as booty and that safe passage was given to Thomas, Harbees, and every citizen of Damascus who was not willing to live under Muslim rule. The peace agreement also stated that the peace would end after three days and that the Muslims could attack after these three days without violating the agreement.

The following pact was drawn up and signed by Khalid ibn al-Walid:

In the name of Allah, the Beneficent, the Merciful. This is given by Khalid bin Al Waleed [sic] to the people of Damascus. When the Muslims enter, they (the people) shall have safety for themselves, their property, their temples and the walls of their city, of which nothing shall be destroyed. They have this guarantee on behalf of Allah, Messenger of Allah, the Caliph (Umar) and the Muslims, from whom they shall receive nothing but good so long as they pay the Jizya.

== Aftermath ==
Jonah, who had helped Khalid enter the city by the East Gate, showed him a short-cut to Antioch. Leading a cavalry regiment, Khalid caught up with a convoy of Byzantine refugees from Damascus at the sea, near Antioch. The three-day truce had passed; Khalid's cavalry attacked the convoy during a heavy rain. In the subsequent battle, Khalid reportedly killed Thomas in a duel. After the Battle of Marj al-Dibaj, the Muslims took a great amount of brocade as booty. In addition, Thomas' wife, the daughter of Heraclius, was captured. According to chronicles, the Greek man Jonah, who guided Khalid on the short cut to Antioch, got his fiance, but she committed suicide. Khalid offered Jonah the daughter of Emperor Heraclius, whom he refused. Khalid sent her back to her father. Jonah died two years later in the Battle of the Yarmuk.

Caliph Abu Bakr died in Medina, making Umar his successor. Umar removed Khalid from command of the Muslim army and appointed Abu Ubayda as the new commander in chief. In later years, following the Battle of the Yarmuk, the Rashidun Caliphate annexed the whole Levant, followed by the conquest of Antioch in 638. By 639, the Byzantines had lost Armenia and Mesopotamia. Emperor Heraclius concentrated on the defenses of Egypt and Anatolia, creating a buffer-zone in Anatolia west of Caesarea by abandoning all the Byzantine fortifications there. The Arabs never invaded Anatolia. However, by 642 the Byzantines lost Egypt and Tripolitania to the Caliphate.

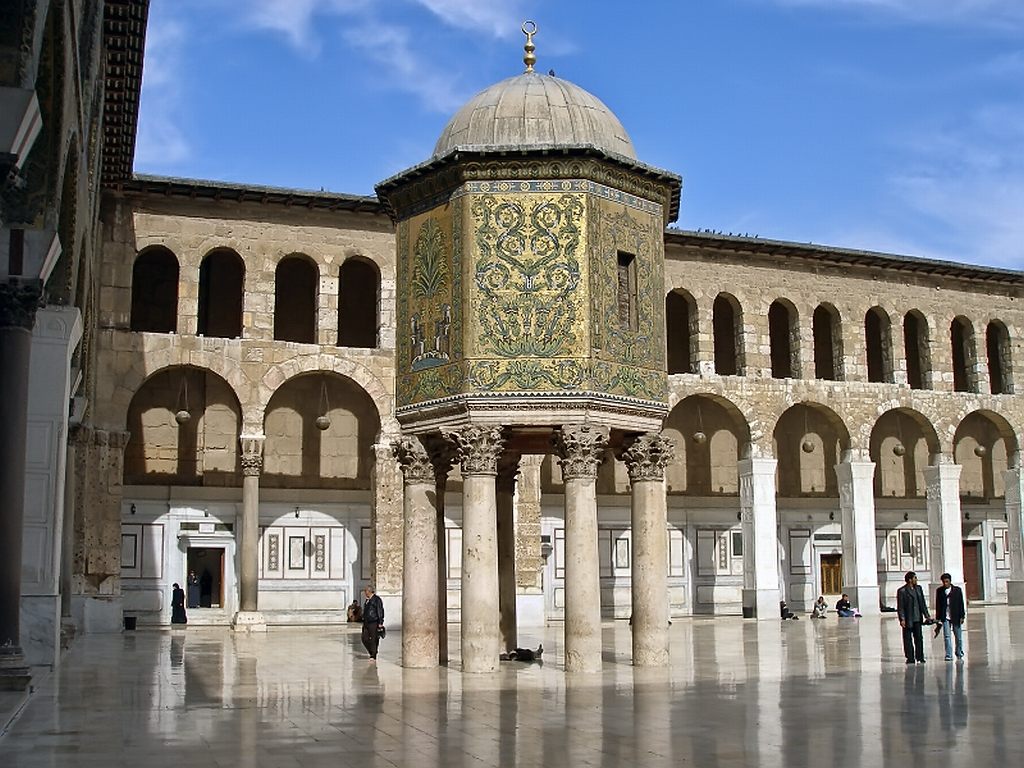
The dome of Damascus' treasury in the Umayyad Mosque

While the Arabs administered the city of Damascus, the population of Damascus remained mostly Christian—Chalcedonian and Miaphysite—with a growing community of Arab Muslims from Makkah, Medina, and the Syrian Desert.

The city was chosen as the capital of Islamic Syria. Its first Muslim governor was Yazid ibn Abu Sufyan, one of the commanders of the Muslim army that captured the city. Yazid died of plague in 640 and his younger brother, Mu'awiya, succeeded him. After the assassination of the last Rashidun caliph, Ali in 661, Mu'awiya installed himself as the caliph of the Islamic empire founding the Umayyad dynasty.

Damascus subsequently became the capital of the Umayyad Caliphate and all of the surplus revenue of the Umayyad Caliphate's provinces was forwarded to the treasury of Damascus. Arabic was also established as the official language, giving the Arab minority of the city an advantage over the Greek-speaking Christians in administrative affairs.

Trade and economics prospered in the city and under the Umayyads, Damascus remained one of the most dazzling cities of the world, until in 750, when it fell to the Abbasids. On 25 August 750, the Abbasids, having already beaten the Umayyads in the Battle of the Zab in Iraq, conquered Damascus after facing little resistance. With the heralding of the Abbasid Caliphate, Damascus became eclipsed and subordinated by Baghdad, the new Islamic capital.

== Bibliography ==
=== Ancient sources ===
- Al-Waqidi, Abu Abdullah Muhammad Ibn Umar (c. 750), Fatuh al Sham (Conquest of Syria)
- Ibn Ishaq, Sirah Rasul Allah, 750.
- Theophanes the Confessor, Chronographia, 810–815.
- Muhammad ibn Jarir al-Tabari, History of the Prophets and Kings, 915.

=== Modern sources ===
- Akram, Agha Ibrahim (2004). The Sword of Allah: Khalid bin al-Waleed – His Life and Campaigns. Oxford University Press. ISBN 0-19-597714-9.
- Archer, Christon I. (2008). World History of Warfare. University of Nevada Press. ISBN 978-0-8032-1941-0.
- Avi-Yonah, Michael (2003). History of Israel and the Holy Land. Continuum International Publishing Group. ISBN 978-0-8264-1526-4.
- Burns, Ross (2007). Damascus: A History. Routledge. ISBN 978-1-134-48850-6.
- Crowdy, Terry (2006). The enemy within: a history of espionage. Osprey Publishing. ISBN 978-1-84176-933-2.
- Greatrex, Geoffrey; Lieu, Samuel N. C. (2002). The Roman Eastern Frontier and the Persian Wars (Part II, 363–630 AD). Routledge. ISBN 0-415-14687-9.
- Haldon, John (1997). Byzantium in the Seventh Century: the Transformation of a Culture. Cambridge. ISBN 0-521-31917-X.
- Kennedy, Hugh N. (2006). The Byzantine and early Islamic Near East. Ashgate Publishing. ISBN 978-0-7546-5909-9.
- Gibbon, Edward; Milman, Henry Hart (2009). The Decline and Fall of the Roman Empire. BiblioBazaar. ISBN 978-1-113-92820-7.
- Nicolle, David (1994). Yarmuk 636 A.D.: The Muslim Conquest of Syria. Osprey Publishing. ISBN 1-85532-414-8.
- Sahas, Daniel J. (1972). John of Damascus on Islam: The "Heresy of the Ishmaelites.". BRILL. ISBN 978-90-04-03495-2.
- Sicker, Martin (2000). The Islamic world in ascendancy: from the Arab conquests to the siege of Vienna. Greenwood Publishing Group. ISBN 978-0-275-96892-2.
- Gibbon, Edward (2008). The History of the Decline and Fall of the Roman Empire, Volume 5. Cosimo, Inc. ISBN 978-1-60520-127-6.
- Pierkins, Russell S. (2017). "Damascus, Arab Conquest of (634 CE)". In Shaw, Jeffrey M.; Demy, Timothy J. (eds.). War and Religion: An Encyclopedia of Faith and Conflict. Vol. 1. ABC-CLIO. pp. 227–228. ISBN 978-1-61069-517-6.
