= Siege of Aleppo (637) =

637 CE siege of Byzantine Syrian city by the Rashidun Caliphate

Coordinates: 36.198133°N 37.16328°E

Siege of Aleppo.
- Part of the Muslim conquest of Syria (Arab–Byzantine wars)
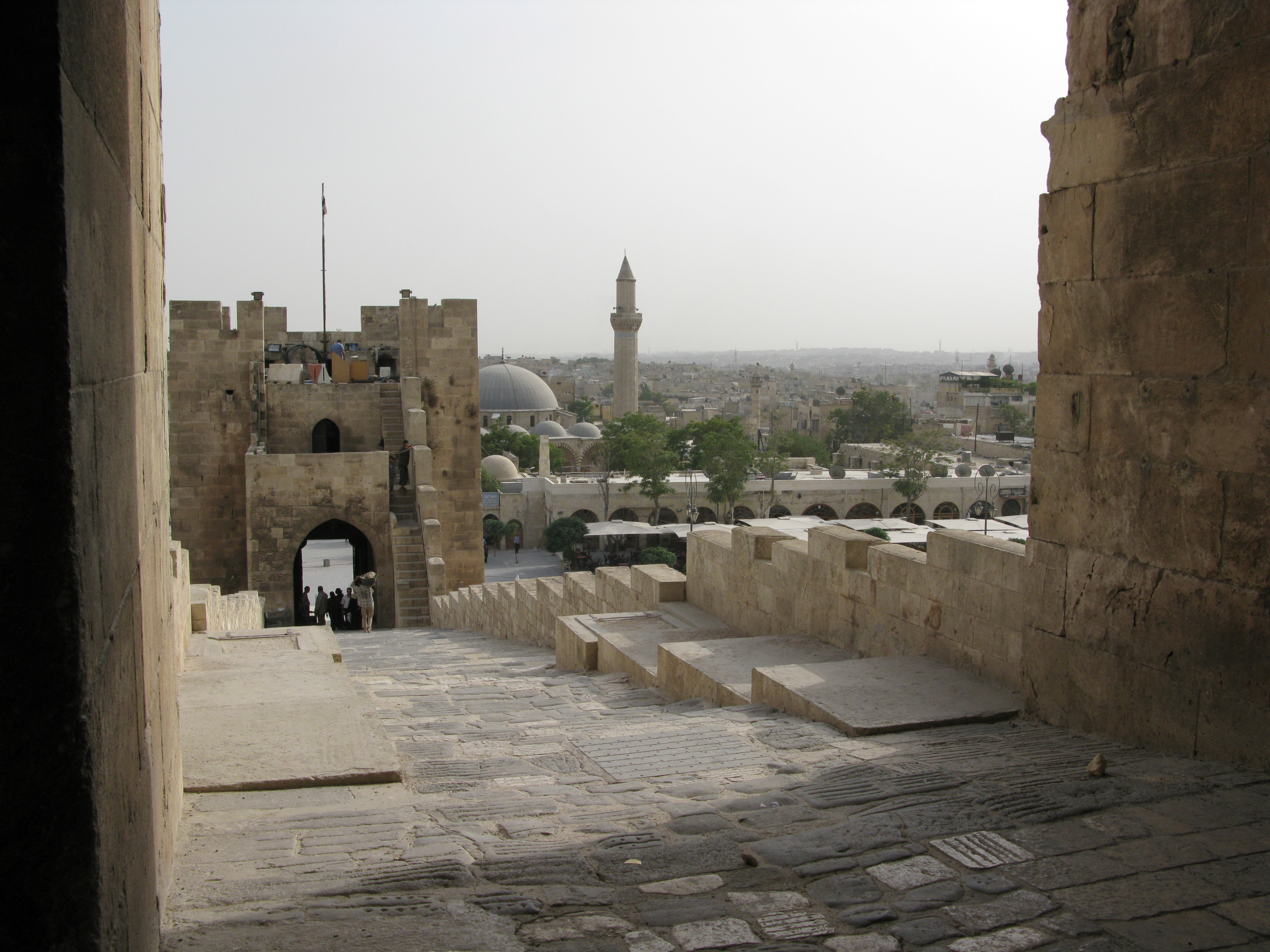
- Aleppo citadel
| Date | August–October 637 AD |
| Location | Aleppo, Byzantine Syria |
| Result | Rashidun Caliphate victory |
| Territorial changes | Aleppo captured by the Rashidun Caliphate |

Belligerents
| Rashidun Caliphate | Byzantine Empire; Ghassanids |

Commanders and leaders
| Khalid ibn al-Walid; Abu Ubayda ibn al-Jarrah; Malik al-Ashtar | Joachim |

Strength
| 17,000 | Unknown |

Casualties and losses
| Minimal | Unknown but more than Muslims |

The siege of Aleppo, the Byzantine stronghold and one of the few remaining Byzantine castles in the northern Levant after the decisive Battle of Yarmouk, was laid between August and October 637.

== Background ==
After the decisive Battle of Yarmouk, the Muslims marched northward deeper into Syria. After taking many small and large cities, both Abu Ubayda ibn al-Jarrah and Khalid ibn al-Walid met at Qinnasarin, and they marched to Aleppo, where a strong garrison under a Roman general named Joachim held the fort. Aleppo consisted of a large walled city and a smaller but virtually impregnable fort outside the city atop a hill, a little more than a quarter of a mile across, surrounded by a wide moat.

== Battle ==
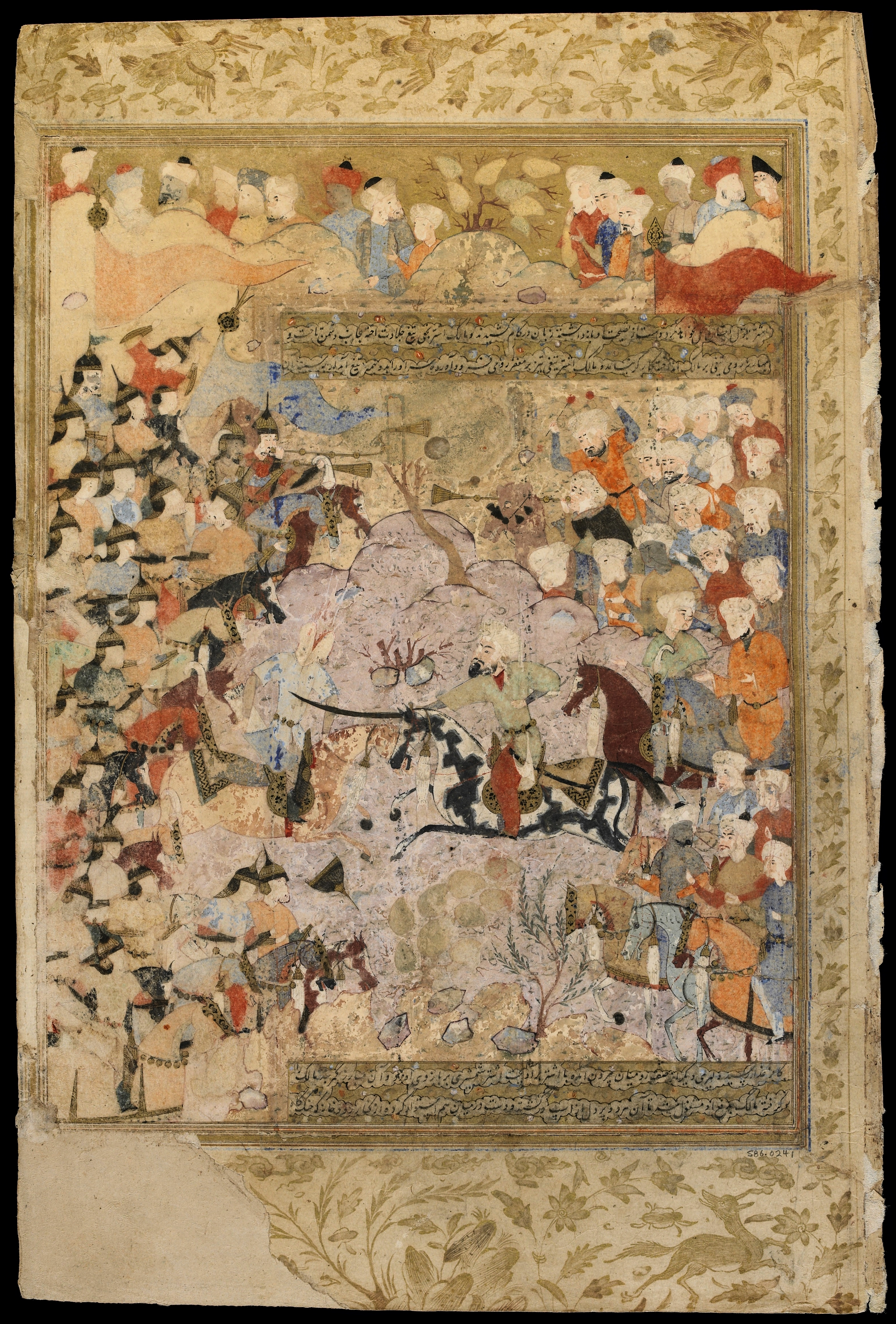
Battle against the Byzantines for Aleppo in 637. Rawdat al-safa (Garden of felicity) by Mirkhwand (d. 1498), Shiraz, 1571-72 (Arthur M. Sackler Collection, S1986.241).

The Byzantine commander at Aleppo, Joachim, met the Muslim army under the command of Khalid and Abu Ubayda in the open outside the fort. He was defeated and hastily retreated to the fort. He boldly launched many sallies to break the siege but failed every time. Joachim received no signs of any help from the emperor Heraclius (who could indeed send none). Consequently, around October 637, the Romans surrendered on terms according to which the soldiers of the garrison were allowed to depart in peace.

== Aftermath ==
Joachim converted to Islam along with his 4,000 Greek soldiers. He would prove himself a remarkably able and loyal officer to the caliphate and would fight gallantly under various Muslim generals. However, according to Peter Crawford, the account of Joachim's conversion with his 4,000 soldiers is doubtful. Abu Ubayda ibn al-Jarrah sent a column under Malik al-Ashtar to take Azaz on the route to 'Rome'. The region which the Muslims called Rome included the area which is now Southern Turkey east of the Taurus Mountains. Malik, assisted by Joachim, captured Azaz and signed a pact with the local inhabitants, whereafter he returned to Aleppo. The capture and clearance of Azaz was essential to ensure that no large Roman forces remained north of Aleppo, whence they could strike at the flank and rear of the Muslims as the next major operation was launched. As soon as Malik al-Ashtar rejoined the army, Abu Ubayda marched westwards to capture Antioch, which was captured after the Battle of the Iron Bridge on October 30, 637.

== Sources ==
- A. I. Akram, The Sword of Allah: Khalid bin al-Waleed, His Life and Campaigns, Nat. Publishing. House, Rawalpindi (1970) ISBN 0-7101-0104-X.
- Crawford, Peter (2013). The War of the Three Gods: Romans, Persians and the Rise of Islam. Barnsley, Great Britain: Pen & Sword Military. ISBN 978-1-84884-612-8.
