= Expedition of Abu Ubayda ibn al-Jarrah (629) =

Expedition of Abu Ubaidah ibn al Jarrah
Date	October 629 AD, 8 AH, 7th month, or 7 AH
Location	Al- Qabaliyyah
Result	Enemy flees, Muslims survive famine

Commanders and leaders
Abu Ubaidah ibn al Jarrah	Unknown

Strength
300	Unknown

Expedition of Abu Ubaidah ibn al Jarrah, also known as the Expedition of Fish and Invasion of al-Khabt, took place in October 629 AD, 8AH, 7th month, of the Islamic Calendar, or according to some scholars in 7AH, 4th Month.

== Expedition ==
In the next month, Muhammad sent Abu Ubaidah ibn al Jarrah along with 300 men to observe a caravan belonging to the Quraish.

During this expedition the Muslims' suffered from famine, until they caught a large fish (sperm whale) that came ashore and ate it for twenty days. Ibn Hisham mention the incident in large detail. This is why it is also known as ‘expedition of fish.’ They brought some of that meat to Muhammad who also ate it.

== Islamic Primary sources ==
The Expedition is referenced in the Sunni hadith collection Sahih al-Bukhari as follows:

"Allah's Apostle sent an army towards the east coast and appointed Abu 'Ubaida bin Al-Jarrah as their chief, and the army consisted of three-hundred men including myself. We marched on till we reached a place where our food was about to finish. Abu- 'Ubaida ordered us to collect all the journey food and it was collected. My (our) journey food was dates. Abu 'Ubaida kept on giving us our daily ration in small amounts from it, till it was exhausted. The share of everyone of us used to be one date only." I said, "How could one date benefit you?" Jabir replied, "We came to know its value when even that too finished." Jabir added, "When we reached the sea-shore, we saw a huge fish which was like a small mountain. The army ate from it for eighteen days. Then Abu 'Ubaida ordered that two of its ribs be fixed and they were fixed in the ground. Then he ordered that a she-camel be ridden and it passed under the two ribs (forming an arch) without touching them."Sahih al-Bukhari, 3:44:663

The Event is also referenced in the Sahih Muslim hadith collection as follows:

Jabir b. 'Abdullah reported: Allah's Messenger (may peace he upon him) sent us (on an expedition). We were three hundred riders and our chief (leader) was 'Ubaida b. al-Jarrah. We were on the look out for a caravan of the Quraish. So we stayed on the coast for half a month, and were so much afflicted by extreme hunger that we (were obliged) to eat leaves. That is why it was called the Detachment of the Leaves. The ocean cast out for us an animal which was called al-'Anbar (whale). We ate of that for half of the month and rubbed its fat on our (bodies) until our bodies became stout. Abu 'Ubaida caught hold of one of its ribs and fixed that up. He then cast a glance at the tallest man of the army and the highest of the camels. and then made him ride over that, and that-tnan passed beneath it (the rib), and many a man could sit in its eye-socket, and we extracted many pitchers of fat from the cavity of its eye. We had small bags containing dates with us (before finding the whale). 'Ubaida gave every person amongst us a handful of dates (and when the provision ran short), he then gave each one of us one date. And when that (stock) was exhausted, we felt its loss.Sahih Muslim, 21:4757

== See also ==
- Military career of Muhammad
- List of expeditions of Muhammad
