= Battle of Sanita-al-Uqab =

634 CE conflict between the Rashidun Caliphate and Byzantine Empire

Battle of Thunayyat-al-Uqab
- Part of the Muslim conquest of Syria (Arab–Byzantine wars)
Date	634
Location	near Al-Qutayfah, Qalamoun Mountains, Syria
Result	Rashidun Caliphate victory

Belligerents
Rashidun Caliphate	Byzantine Empire

Commanders and leaders
Khalid ibn al-Walid	Unknown

The Battle of Thunayyat-al-Uqab (Arabic: معركة ثنية العقاب) was fought in 634 between forces of the Rashidun Caliphate led by the Muslim general Khalid ibn al-Walid against a Byzantine force sent by Byzantine Emperor Heraclius to relieve the besieged garrison of Damascus. Leading up to the battle, the Caliphate forces had intended to isolate the city of Damascus from the rest of the region; Khalid placed detachments in the south on the road to Palestine and in the north on the Damascus-Emesa route, and several other smaller detachments on routes towards Damascus. These detachments were to act as scouts and as delaying forces against Byzantine reinforcements. Heraclius's reinforcements were intercepted, and though they initially gained the upper hand, were routed at the al Uqab (Eagle) Pass when Khalid personally arrived with reinforcements.
