= Battle of the Iron Bridge =

637 AD battle between the Byzantine Empire and the Rashidun Caliphate

Coordinates: 36°14′54″N 36°21′11″E

- Part of the Muslim conquest of Syria (Arab–Byzantine wars)
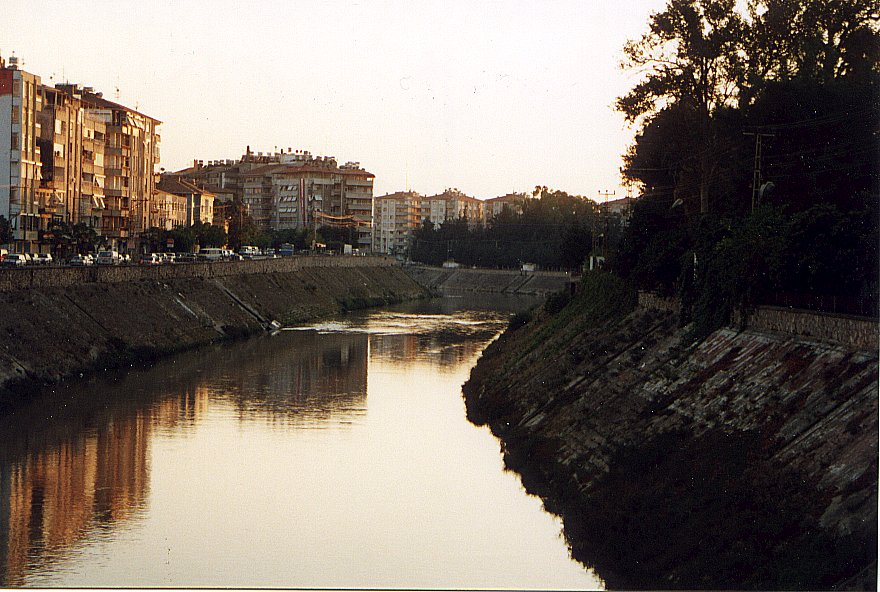
- The Orontes River at its passage in Antioch; the battle was fought near this river
Date	October 637 AD
Location	Gephyra near Antioch, Roman Syria
Result	Rashidun victory
Territorial changes	Antioch conquered by the Rashidun Caliphate

Belligerents
Rashidun Caliphate	Byzantine Empire; Christian Arabs

Commanders and leaders
Khalid ibn al-Walid; Abu Ubayda ibn al-Jarrah; Malik al-Ashtar	Unknown

Strength
17,000	15,000–20,000

Casualties and losses
Unknown	Unknown

The Battle of the Iron Bridge was fought between the Muslim Rashidun army and the Byzantine army in 637 AD. The battle, which the Muslims won, took its name from a nearby nine-arch stone bridge over the Orontes River (also known as Jisr al-Hadid), which had gates trimmed with iron blades. It was one of the last battles fought between the Byzantines and Rashidun Caliphate in the province of Syria. In the aftermath of the battle, the province's capital, Antioch, fell, marking the near-complete annexation of the province into the Rashidun Caliphate.

== Background ==
The Rashidun army had decisively won the Battle of the Yarmuk, after which they managed to gain control of the Levant. Jerusalem was conquered shortly afterwards. Rashidun forces then marched north, conquering other portions of the Levant. They penetrated into northern Syria near its borders with Anatolia intending to capture Antioch, and to secure the conquered lands from any threat from the north. After the conquest of Aleppo, Abu Ubayda ibn al-Jarrah sent a column under Malik al-Ashtar to take Azaz in Northern Syria, east of the Taurus Mountains. The capture and clearance of Azaz was needed to ensure that no large Byzantine forces remained north of Aleppo, from where they could strike at the flank and rear of the Rashidun army during the operation against Antioch. As soon as Malik rejoined the army, Abu Ubayda marched west to capture Antioch, with Khalid ibn al-Walid leading the advance guard with his Mobile guard. The army marched westward directly from Aleppo via Harim and approached Antioch from the east.

== Battle ==
Twenty kilometers (12 mi) from the city, near modern-day Mahruba, a bridge of iron spanned the Orontes River. It was here that the battle was fought between the Rashidun army and the Byzantine garrison defending Antioch. A major battle was fought, the details of which are not recorded. It is possible that, similar to other Arab battles near rivers, the Romans were drawn away from the bridge and then hit in the flanks by the Arabs. Khalid ibn Walid played a prominent role with his Mobile guard, as he had done during the Battle of the Yarmouk. The Byzantine forces suffered heavy losses and were defeated. The Byzantine casualties in this battle were the third highest in the Muslim conquest of Syria, only exceeded by the battles of Ajnadayn and Yarmouk. The remnants of the defeated Byzantine force retreated to Antioch. The Rashidun army later moved up and laid siege to Antioch, focusing on the Bridge and the Eastern gate (also Beroea gate). The city surrendered on 30 October 637. According to the treaty the citizens were allowed to depart in peace or forced to pay a tax.

== Aftermath ==
Following the surrender of Antioch, Rashidun army columns moved south along the Mediterranean coast and captured Latakia, Jablah and Tartus (Syria), thus capturing most of north-western Syria. Other columns were sent to subdue the remaining resistance in northern Syria. Khalid ibn Walid was sent with his cavalry on a raid eastwards, up to the Euphrates in the vicinity of Manbij, but found little opposition. The campaign was ended in early January 638. After the defeat of pro-Byzantine Christian Arabs from Al Jazira, who laid siege to Emessa in March 638, Abu Ubaidah sent more columns under Khalid ibn Walid and Iyad ibn Ghanm to subdue Jazira near the Syrian frontiers and in Anatolia. These columns went northwards as far as the Ararat plain and west towards the Taurus Mountains. The Taurus Mountains in Anatolia thus marked the westernmost frontier of the Rashidun Caliphate in Anatolia.
