= Battle of Ajnadayn =

634 CE Arab-Byzantine conflict

Coordinates: 31°41′N 34°57′E

- Part of the Muslim conquest of Syria (Arab–Byzantine wars)
Date	30 July 634
Location	Ajnadayn, Palaestina Prima
Result	Rashidun victory
Territorial changes	Most of Palestine (Palaestina Prima) conquered by the Caliphate

Belligerents
Byzantine Empire	Rashidun Caliphate

Commanders and leaders
Vardan †; Aretion; Theodore; Vahan	Khalid ibn al-Walid; Amr ibn al-As

Strength
10,000 (Note: "At Ajnadayn, the Greeks would have had 100,000 men, at the Yarmuk, 200,000. In Egypt, the total strength of local forces is estimated at 25,000-30,000 men. This figure is not exaggerated although the preceding figures certainly are.") (Note: "The numbers of the combatants, especially on the Greek side, are highly exaggerated in the Arabic sources; and it is probable that in reality the forces on either side scarcely reached 10,000 men.") c. 20,000	10,000 – c. 20,000

Casualties and losses
1,700 killed, 5,000 wounded (modern estimates)	N/A

The Battle of Ajnadayn (Arabic: معركة أجنادين) was fought in July or August 634 (Jumada I or II, 13 AH), in a location close to Bayt Jibrin; it was the first major pitched battle between the Byzantine (Roman) Empire and the army of the Arab Rashidun Caliphate. The result of the battle was a decisive Muslim victory. The details of this battle are mostly known through Muslim sources, such as the ninth-century historian al-Waqidi.

== Sources ==
Regarding the primary sources, there is an absence of any of Byzantine provenance; possibly, according to Walter Kaegi, because what Byzantine material exists may conflate the battle with other Byzantine defeats, such as Dathin and Yarmouk. The earliest source appears to be an entry in the Frankish Chronicle of Fredegar, compiled in 658-660, unless this is a possible interpolation.

== Background ==
According to David Nicolle, the Rashidun army left the capital Medina probably in the autumn of 633, but possibly at the beginning of 634. They first engaged and defeated the Byzantines at Dathin on February 4; after that Emperor Heraclius, then stationed in Emesa, had reinforcements sent south to protect Caesarea Maritima. As a possible reaction, Muslim general Khalid ibn al-Walid was ordered to interrupt operations against the Sassanian Empire and reach Syria, which brought him to engage and defeat the Byzantine-allied Ghassanids by April 24, permitting him to enter almost unopposed Bosra. At this point, Khalid converged with several armies, led by other Arab Muslim generals such as Abu Ubaydah ibn al-Jarrah, Yazid ibn Abi Sufyan, Amr ibn al-As and Shurahbil ibn Hasana.

Khalid united with Amr's forces in a place known traditionally as Ajnadayn. The site is placed by the Muslim literary sources somewhere between Ramla and Bayt Jibrin (modern Beit Guvrin), both in modern Israel, but is otherwise unattested by any geographer of the period. Based on the region's topography, the historian N. A. Miednikoff suggested that the battle was fought on the Wadi al-Samt river (Valley of Elah), where lies the twin village of al-Jannaba. According to the hypothesis advanced by Miednikoff and Michael Jan de Goeje and summarized by Leone Caetani, it was from the dual form (al-Jannabatayn) of the village the historical name of the battle emerged, by conflation with the plural for "army", ajnad.

== Opposing forces ==
Regarding the strength of the confronting armies, H. A. R. Gibb in the Encyclopaedia of Islam argues that, at best, both forces were made up of 10,000 men, and that the numbers offered in the Muslim sources are "highly exaggerated", especially as regards the Byzantines. David Morray in the Oxford Companion to Military History, however, places both armies at approximately 20,000 strong.

The Byzantines were led by Heraclius' brother Theodore, as well as by a figure called "Wardan" according to al-Azdi, possibly a corruption of the Armenian name Vardan. The Muslim sources name him as the patrikios (commander) of Emesa, which was the major Byzantine base of operations in Syria in the early period of the Muslim conquests. According to Kaegi, he possibly commanded fresh reinforcements from the north, including Armenians, or from the army that had accompanied Heraclius to Syria. In Al-Tabari's account, the Byzantines are led by the governor of Jerusalem, Aretion. The Arab army consisted of three separate contingents, with either Khalid or, less likely, Amr, as the overall commander. Some chronicles also state that Sergius, the governor of Caesarea was present at the battle, but others say he died in February.

Despite the evidence from primary sources on both sides that the Byzantine army numbered 40,000 men, it should be assumed that this number is overestimated, since for such a large army, the losses of 1,700 killed and 5,000 wounded are not so great as to make it unable to withstand half the size of the Arab army. Therefore, we can assume that the Byzantine army was approximately equal to the Arab army in terms of numbers. Moreover, it is fair to say that the city police were sent against the Arabs, whose training was not the best.

== Battle ==
According to George Nafziger, the details of the battle are not detailed specifically, except that a Rashidun commander named Dhiraar ibn al-Azwar slew many Byzantine champions by his own hands, including two provincial governors.

The Byzantines suffered a heavy defeat and were forced to retreat to Damascus. The Arabs suffered heavy casualties, and Muslim tradition records several lists of Companions of Muhammad, including several members of the early Muslim aristocracy, who fell in the battle and were regarded as martyrs. The high number of deaths served to reinvigorate the sense of religious martyrdom among the nascent Muslim community, while the high proportion of Meccan deaths served as a useful counterbalance to the influence of the Medinan Ansar. On the Byzantine side, the Muslim sources report that one of the two commanders, probably Vardan, fell in the battle. The cubicularius was also found dead in the centre of the battlefield with a cloth wrapped around his head, likely due to injury. However, Theodore escaped and withdrew north, where Heraclius replaced him with Vahan and Theodore Trithyrius and sent him to imprisonment in Constantinople. The Chronicle of Fredegar reports that the Arabs stole much from Ajnadayn, and offered to resell their loot to Heraclius, but he angrily refused.

== Aftermath ==
Heraclius himself withdrew from Emesa to the greater safety of Antioch after Ajnadayn, while the surviving Byzantine units fled to the safety of walled towns, and left the countryside undefended before the Muslim raids. The whole of Palestine was thus left open to Muslim raids, especially in the interior parts away from the coastal towns. As a result, panic spread across the region, and large numbers of the rural population also sought safety behind the town walls. After their victory, the Arab army once more broke up into several raiding columns, with Amr capturing the interior towns of Nablus (Neapolis), Sabastiya (Sebastia), al-Ludd (Diospolis), Yibna, Amwas (Emmaus-Nicopolis) and Bayt Jibrin (Eleutheropolis) and the coastal town of Yafa (Jaffa). Most of these localities surrendered after token resistance due to the flight of Byzantine troops. The Arab columns reunited once more to confront another Byzantine attempt at halting the Muslim invasion at the Battle of Fahl (near Pella in modern Jordan) six months later.

== Bibliography ==
- Bolshakov, Oleg (2002). История Халифата. Том 2. Эпоха великих завоеваний 633-656 [History of the Caliphate. Volume 2. The Era of Great Conquests 633-656] (in Russian). ISBN 5-02-017376-2.
- Athamina, Khalil (2014). "Ad̲j̲nādayn". The Encyclopedia of Islam, Third Edition. BRILL. ISSN 1573-3912.
- Canard, Marius (2016). "The Arab Expansion: The Military Problem". In Donner, Fred M. (ed.). The Expansion of the Early Islamic State. Routledge. pp. 63–80. ISBN 9781351890021.
- Donner, Fred McGraw (1981). The Early Islamic Conquests. Princeton University Press. ISBN 978-0691053271.
- Gibb, H.A.R. (1986). "Ad̲j̲nādayn". The Encyclopedia of Islam, New Edition, Volume I: A–B. Leiden and New York: BRILL. p. 208. ISBN 90-04-08114-3.
- Kaegi, Walter Emil (1995). Byzantium and the early Islamic conquests. Cambridge: Cambridge University Press. ISBN 978-0-521-48455-8.
- Morray, David (2001). "Ajnadain, battle of". In Richard Holmes (ed.). The Oxford Companion to Military History. Oxford University Press.
- Sourdel, D. (1965). "Filasṭīn — I. Palestine under Islamic Rule". In Lewis, B.; Pellat, Ch. & Schacht, J. (eds.). The Encyclopaedia of Islam, Second Edition. Volume II: C–G. Leiden: E. J. Brill. pp. 910–913. OCLC 495469475.
