= Battle of Fahl =

Part of Muslim Conquest of Levant

Coordinates: 32°27′N 35°37′E

- Part of the Muslim conquest of Syria (Arab–Byzantine wars)
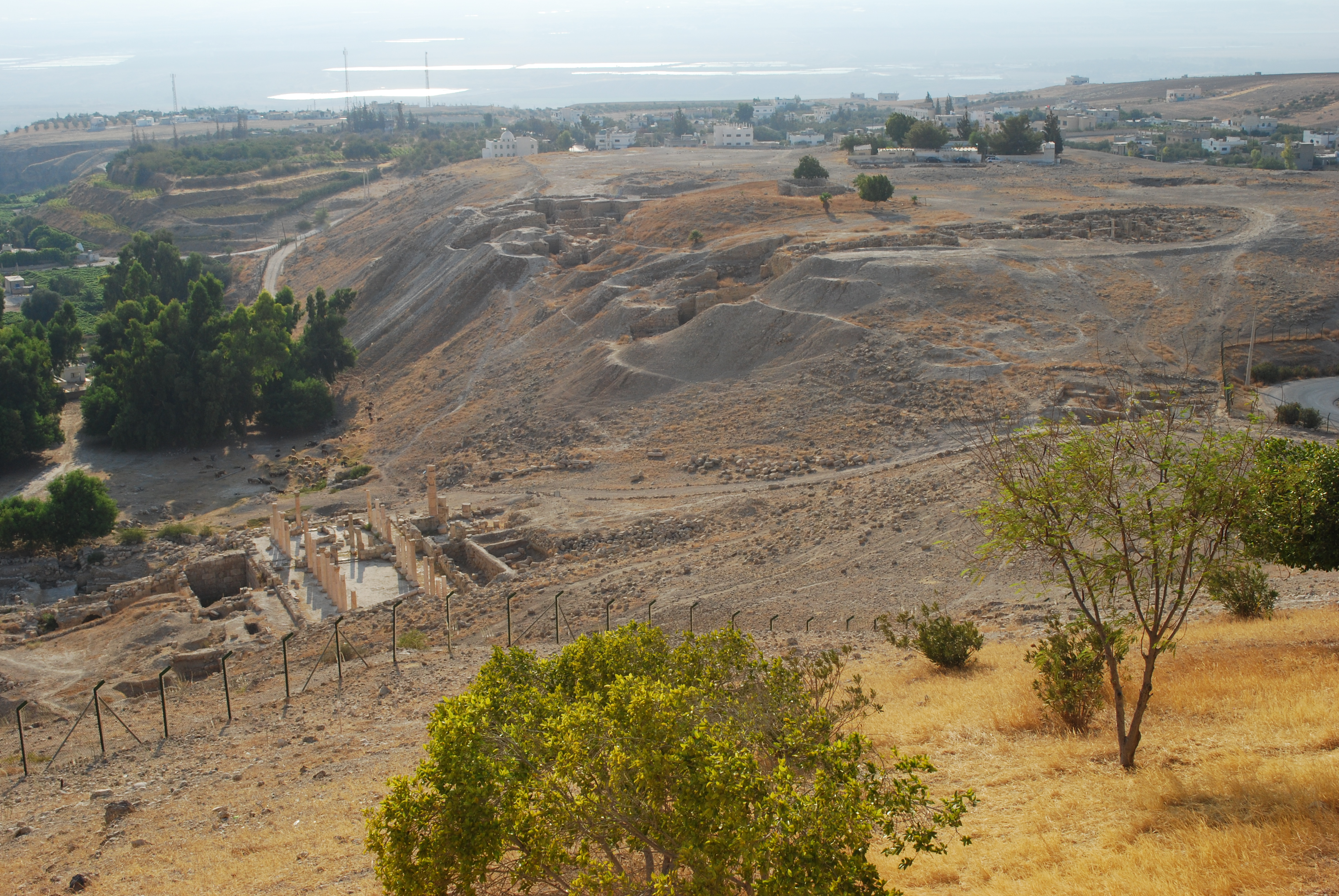
- The ruins of Pella
Date	January 635 AD (13 AH)
Location	Fahl (Pella), Byzantine Empire
Result	Muslim victory

Belligerents
Rashidun Caliphate	Byzantine Empire

Commanders and leaders
Khalid ibn al-Walid; Amr ibn al-As; Abu Ubayda ibn al-Jarrah; Shurahbil ibn Hasana; Abu al-A'war	Theodore Trithyrius (identified in Muslim sources as Saqallar ibn Mithraq)

Strength
20,000–30,000 (estimations)	50,000–100,000 (Arab sources)

Casualties and losses
A few hundreds to a few thousands	100,000 killed

The Battle of Fahl (Arabic: يوم فحل, romanized: Yawm Faḥl), also known as the Battle of the Marshes (Yawm al-Radagha) and the Battle of Beisan (Yawm Baysān), was a major battle in the Muslim conquest of Byzantine Syria fought by the Arab troops of the Rashidun Caliphate and Byzantine forces at or near Pella (Fahl) and nearby Scythopolis (Beisan), both in the Jordan Valley, in December 634 or January 635.

Byzantine troops smarting from their rout by the Muslims at the battle of Ajnadayn had regrouped in Pella or Scythopolis and the Muslims pursued them there. The Muslim cavalry faced difficulty traversing the muddied grounds around Beisan as the Byzantines cut irrigation ditches to flood the area and stave off the Muslim advance. The Muslims ultimately defeated the Byzantines, who are said to have suffered enormous casualties. Pella was subsequently captured, while Beisan and nearby Tiberias capitulated after short sieges by detachments of Muslim troops.

== Dating ==
According to the version of Ibn Ishaq (d. 767), al-Waqidi (d. 823) and the Syria-based Sa'id ibn Abd al-Aziz al-Tanukhi (fl. c. 800), which is the version generally followed by al-Yaqubi (d. 897), the Battle of Fahl took place on Dhu al-Qada 13 AH (December 634 or January 635 CE). The other common version among the Muslim sources was that transmitted by Sayf ibn Umar (d. 786–809) from the Syria-based Abu Uthman Yazid ibn Asid al-Ghassani, as well as Abu Haritha ibn Abshami and others, all of whom obtained their information from one of two earlier sources, who were known only as Khalid or Ubada. In this version of events, the date of the Battle of Fahl is not provided, only that it occurred after the fall of Damascus, which this version places in Shawwal 14 AH (November or December 635).

== Battle ==
Location of the battle and associated sieges, as shown in present-day Jordan and Israel

According to the historian Hugh N. Kennedy, "the course of [the] battle is not entirely clear". In the version of Ibn Ishaq/al-Waqidi, following the decisive Muslim victory against Byzantine forces at the Battle of Ajnadayn in central Palestine, the surviving Byzantine troops retreated in disarray to the east bank of the River Jordan and took up base in Fahl (Pella to the Byzantines), a city in the well-watered Jordan Valley with an acropolis (hilltop citadel). The Muslims pursued them there, but were hindered on the way by muddy ground around Beisan (Scythopolis to the Byzantines), a town located west of the River Jordan, 12 kilometers (7.5 mi) from Fahl. The Byzantines had tactically broken the river banks to cause their waters to flood the area and stave off the Muslim horsemen. Kennedy calls these "irrigation ditches". As the surroundings of Beisan subsequently became a marsh, the Battle of Fahl is alternatively called Yawm al-Radagha ('Battle of the Marshes'), or the 'Battle of Beisan'.

The flooding of the area caught the Muslim troops unawares, but they nonetheless traversed the muddied grounds across the River Jordan. They defeated the Byzantines at or near Fahl. While the city may have been captured during the Muslim victory, it also may have hosted the surviving Byzantine troops from that battle and held out, capitulating after a four-month siege. Per the terms of the surrender, the Byzantine troops departed the city, ultimately regrouping in Damascus. The overall commander of the Muslim forces at the Battle of Fahl was either Khalid ibn al-Walid, Amr ibn al-As, or Abu Ubayda ibn al-Jarrah, with Shurahbil ibn Hasana participating as a deputy commander.

In the version of events transmitted by Sayf ibn Umar, the overall commander of the Muslim troops in Syria, Abu Ubayda ibn al-Jarrah, organized a contingent led by ten lieutenant commanders with Abu'l-A'war at their head to attack Fahl. There, some remnants of the defeated Byzantine troops from the Battle of the Yarmuk, a major battle fought on the banks of the Yarmuk River north of Fahl, had gathered. The Muslim force besieged the city, while Abu Ubayda headed off with the main body of the Muslim forces to besiege Damascus, where the other Byzantine remnants from Yarmuk had relocated. Upon the approach of Abu'l-A'war's forces, the Byzantines in Fahl sabotaged the wells around the city and withdrew to Beisan. There, the muddy swamps which characterized the surrounding area prevented the Muslim horsemen from engaging. After the fall of Damascus, Abu Ubayda and part of the Muslim army joined the Muslim troops at Fahl.

Once Abu Ubayda arrived, he dispatched Abu'l-A'war to Tiberias, just north of Beisan, which he besieged. The troops already encamped at Fahl remained largely stationary due to the unnavigable conditions around Beisan and the especially large concentration of Byzantine forces in the Beisan/Fahl area. However, the Byzantines under a commander identified by the Muslim sources as Saqallar ibn Mikhraq (Theodore the Sacellarius, 'Saqallar' being a corruption of sacellarius) launched a surprise sortie from Beisan against the Muslims positioned near Fahl under Abu Ubayda. The Byzantines were successfully countered and then routed with heavy losses. Saqallar was slain and replaced by another commander, referred to as Nasturus.

According to one of the Muslim accounts associated with the narrative of Ibn Ishaq and al-Waqidi, the Byzantines suffered huge fatalities, with one reporting the fantastical figure of 100,000 slain with survivors barricading in Fahl. In the narrative cited by the 9th-century historian Ibn A'tham al-Kufi, the Byzantine forces at Fahl numbered 100,000 altogether, while the Muslims stood at 20,000-strong and did not include Khalid and his men, who were confronting the Byzantines at Baalbek (Heliopolis to the Byzantines, northwest of Damascus). An account associated with Sayf ibn Umar's version puts the number of Byzantine cavalry at 80,000.

== Aftermath ==
After his victory, Abu Ubayda moved on to Homs (Emesa to the Byzantines) with Khalid and the main body of troops, leaving Shurahbil and Amr ibn al-As in charge of Fahl. He tasked them with capturing Beisan, which after a short siege capitulated on terms similar to those reached in Damascus. The general outline of those terms was that Byzantine troops and loyalists were to depart the city safely, churches and property not vacated would not be disturbed, vacant properties were to be confiscated and a tribute was to be paid to the Muslim forces. Meanwhile, Abu'l-A'war secured the capitulation of Tiberias on similar terms once the city surrendered after its defenders became aware of the Byzantine defeats in Damascus and Fahl. According to Ross Burns, the result of this battle significantly reduced the capacity of Byzantine army to operate in southern Syria, as historian Ross Burns said in his book, the massive losses from this battle and the Battle of Ajnadayn practically wiped out the "southern Damascus shield", an Imperial main forces protected the southern Syria.

== Bibliography ==
- Blankinship, Khalid Yahya, ed. (1993). The History of al-Ṭabarī, Volume XI: The Challenge to the Empires. SUNY Series in Near Eastern Studies. Albany, New York: State University of New York Press. ISBN 978-0-7914-0851-3.
- Donner, Fred M. (1981). The Early Islamic Conquests. Princeton: Princeton University Press. ISBN 0-691-05327-8.
- Kennedy, Hugh (2007). The Great Arab Conquests: How the Spread of Islam Changed the World We Live In. Philadelphia: Da Capo Press. ISBN 978-0-306-81585-0.
- Buhl, Fr. & Sourdel, D. (1965). "Faḥl". In Lewis, B.; Pellat, Ch. & Schacht, J. (eds.). The Encyclopaedia of Islam, Second Edition. Volume II: C–G. Leiden: E. J. Brill. p. 743. OCLC 495469475.
- Burns, Ross (2007) [2005]. Damascus: A History. Routledge. ISBN 978-1-134-48849-0.
