= Jabala ibn al-Ayham =

Last ruler of the Ghassanid state in the 7th century

- Preceded by: Al-Nu'man ibn al-Mundhir
- Succeeded by: Position Abolished

Personal details
- Born: 570 Ghassanid Kingdom
- Died: 645 Byzantine Empire
- Occupation: King
- Dynasty: Ghassanid
- Father: al-Ayham ibn Harith

Jabala ibn al-Ayham (Arabic: جبلة بن الأيهم) was the last ruler, or phylarch, of the Ghassanid dynasty in Syria in the 7th century. He commanded Arab Christian tribal contingents on behalf of the Byzantine Empire against Arab Muslim forces during the Muslim conquest of Syria in the 630s.

In the battles of Dumat al-Jandal in northern Arabia and the decisive battle of Yarmuk in southern Syria in 636, his forces were defeated. He supposedly converted to Islam, before breaking ties with the faith in protest to indignities he consequently suffered related to Islamic egalitarian principles. Afterward, he left Syria permanently, taking refuge with his tribesmen in Byzantine Anatolia. Historians are divided on the historicity of Jabala due the lack of contemporary source material, with some arguing his personality was essentially a literary device of later Islamic writers.

== Sources ==
There are no contemporary sources about Jabala, with the narratives of his life derived from Abbasid-era (post-750 CE) literature. However, a seal dated to the late 6th or early 7th century inscribed with the words 'Gabala, patrikios' next to etches of Christian crosses has led to speculative identification with Jabala ibn al-Ayham by the historian Irfan Shahid.

== Life ==
=== Fight against the Muslim invasion ===
In the stories of Jabala in the Islamic literature, he is figured as the last Ghassanid king and a military leader of the Byzantine Empire's Christian Arab contingent during the Muslim conquest of Syria. He is cited in such a capacity during the siege of Dumat al-Jandal in c. 630, where he commands the Ghassanid and Tanukhid tribes against the Muslims, and at the Battle of the Yarmuk in 636, during which the Muslim Arabs routed the Byzantines and went on to conquer Syria from them. According to the Abbasid-era authors Ibn Ishaq, al-Waqidi, and al-Baladhuri, at Yarmuk, Jabala led 12,000 men of the Ghassanids and the other Christian tribes of Lakhm, Judham, and groups of the Quda'a tribe, such as the Balqayn and Bali.

The Islamic literature abounds with stories of Jabala's conversion to Islam sometime after Yarmuk, then leaving Islam and taking refuge under Emperor Heraclius. There are different versions of the stories, but they generally have Jabala arrive to the Muslim capital at Medina with his entourage, set off for the Hajj pilgrimage with Caliph Umar, have an altercation with a lowly pilgrim whose nose he ultimately breaks, threaten to leave Islam, and finally make a nightly escape which ends with his relocation to Byzantine territory.

=== Retreat into Byzantine territory ===
Jabala's flight to Byzantium supposedly occurred in c. 639 and he made the trek through Raqqa (Byzantine Callinicum) with 30,000 of his or allied Christian Arab tribesmen (incl. Tanukhids and Iyad Arabs) and their families. While they were close to Baghras crossing to Cilicia, they were attacked by Maysara ibn Masruq who had been dispatched by Abu Ubayda ibn al-Jarrah, the supreme commander of the Muslim troops in Syria. While some sources claim that the refugees were massacred, a complete annihilation is unlikely as the force of Maysara ibn Masruq was much smaller and it is known that several of the Arab refugees later served Byzantium. The survivors thereafter took abode in the Charsianon region of Byzantine Anatolia. The geographer al-Istakhri mentions the descendants of these tribesmen in that region during the 10th century. According to the historian Walter Kaegi, the purported flight of so many Arab tribesmen was a motivating factor for the Muslims to conquer Raqqa and Upper Mesopotamia in general, so as to prevent such nomadic exodus from the conquered lands to Byzantium; such exodus contravened caliph Umar's policy of subjugating all nomadic Arab tribes under the Caliphate's rule. The Byzantine emperor Nikephoros I is said to have been a descendant of Jabala.

== Assessment ==
Shahid considers the existence of Jabala as possible "evidence" for the Byzantines' revival of the Ghassanid phylarchate following its destruction during the Sasanian Persian invasion of Byzantine Syria in 614. In the view of historian Julia Bray, references to Jabala in the Islamic literature represent "the archetype" of the bygone era "of jahiliyya, Christianity, and kingship" in Arab history, and the transition to the new Islamic era. The historian Greg Fisher assesses Jabala as "a semi-mythical figure" used in the literature to "test the purity of the new [Muslim] faith, celebrate the greatness of the empire that the muhajirun [Muslim conquerors] supplanted, and serve all kinds of other useful literary and rhetorical purposes".

== Bibliography ==
- Cooper, Eric; Decker, Michael J. (2012). Life and Society in Byzantine Cappadocia. Springer. p. 42. ISBN 978-1137029645.
- Donner, Fred M. (1981). The Early Islamic Conquests. Princeton: Princeton University Press. ISBN 0-691-05327-8.
- Fisher, Greg (2020). "Arab Statesmen in the Sixth Century". Rome, Persia, and Arabia: Shaping the Middle East from Pompey to Muhammad. Abingdon and New York: Routledge. ISBN 9780429356483.
- Kaegi, Walter E. (1995). Byzantium and the Early Islamic Conquests. Cambridge: Cambridge University Press. ISBN 0-521-41172-6.
- Shahid, I. (1965). "Djabala b. al-Ayham". In Lewis, B.; Pellat, Ch. & Schacht, J. (eds.). The Encyclopaedia of Islam, Second Edition. Volume II: C–G. Leiden: E. J. Brill. p. 354. OCLC 495469475.
- Syvänne, Ilkka (29 December 2022). Military History of Late Rome 602–641. Pen and Sword Military. pp. 284–285. ISBN 978-1-3990-7568-8.
