= Theodore Trithyrius =

Byzantine Greek military general (died 636)

Theodore Trithyrius (Greek: Θεόδωρος Τριθύριος; died 636), commonly known by his title as Theodore the Sacellarius, was a Byzantine treasurer of the state (sacellarius) and a military commander during the last years of the reign of Byzantine emperor Heraclius.

== Life ==
Based in Antioch during the 7th century, Trithyrius was a Greek Christian treasurer working for the Byzantine authority of Emperor Heraclius and extremely loyal to the emperor himself. He enjoyed supremacy under his title of sacellarius, usually appointed to the state treasurer.

In 634, the emperor sent his brother Theodore to fighting the invading armies of Arabs in Ajnadayn where he was decisively defeated. On his retreat, Theodore blamed his brother's incestuous marriage to their niece Martina for the defeat of the Byzantine empire and delved into an argument with him. Heraclius stripped him of his command and sent him to Constantinople. With Theodore gone, Heraclius appointed Trithyrius to take lead as the commander of his brother's army.

In 635, however, things were beginning to take a serious toll when the Byzantine armies failed considerably at other battles. This partly due to financial setbacks and the Byzantine empire failing to provide salaries for the troops, Trithyrius found himself in another role. For most times, Trithyrius's role with the army served as a constant reassurance. A certain lassitude had filled the air and Heraclius had to disband many regiments for economy's sake. There was no enthusiasm towards joining the army, however the presence of the imperial paymaster encouraged mercenary recruitment.

The Muslim conquest of Syria appeared a significant threat to the Byzantine Empire and Heraclius thus ordered Trithyrius to lead an army to counter the attacks. His real role with the army is questionable, but his involvement brought reassurance nonetheless. In August 636, he charged down to the Yarmouk River, an eastern tributary of the Jordan River, to fight the Rashidun army at the Battle of Yarmouk.

Against the opposing military leader Khalid ibn al-Walid, Trithyrius decided to give the command to Vahan, an Armenian prince, as he felt he was not a formidable army commander. This was to no avail and he died on 20 August 636 on the battlefield at Yarmouk.
