= Ayn Zakar =

Ayn Zakar عين ذكر Ain Dakar, Ain Dakkar, Ayn Dhakar, Ein Thakar
- Village
- Location within Syria
- Coordinates: 32°51′30″N 35°54′23″E
- Grid position: 234/252 PAL
- Country: Syria
- Governorate: Daraa
- District: Daraa
- Subdistrict: Shajara

Population (2004 census)
  - Total: 2,041
- Time zone: UTC+3 (AST)

Ayn Zakar (عين ذكر; also transliterated Ain Dakar, Ain Dakkar, Ein Thakar) is a village in southern Syria, administratively part of the Daraa Governorate. According to the Syrian Central Bureau of Statistics, it had a population of 2,041 in the 2004 census.

== History ==
In the 1880s Gottlieb Schumacher said that Ayn Zakar was "a miserable-looking village ... situated on a stony hill", consisting of thirty stone and mud-built huts. There were about sixty Muslim inhabitants, all members of the Wuld Ali branch of the Anaza, a large Bedouin tribe which was numerous in the Hauran plain. The Wuld Ali had been present in the Hauran since at least the early 18th century, often cooperating with the Ottoman provincial authorities in Damascus as guards and guides for the annual Hajj caravans which passed through the region on the way to Mecca. This lucrative role was contested by the Rwala, a rival branch of the Anaza, beginning in the late 18th century and the two brother tribes often clashed and competed for government favor throughout the early 19th century.

By the late 19th century, the Rwala had emerged the stronger party. The Wuld Ali began settling down in Ayn Zakar during this period, engaging in farming, a practice traditionally disdained by the tribe (and the Bedouin in general), in contrast to previous decades when they lived off collecting tribute from the region's peasants. At the time of Schumacher's visit in the 1880s, the village was owned by a leading sheikh of the Wuld Ali, Muhammad al-Smeir (or Ismayr or Smayr), who settled his tribesmen there.

== Bibliography ==
- Lewis, Norman (2000). "The Syrian Steppe during the Last Century of Ottoman Rule: Hawran and the Palmyrena". In Mundy, Martha; Musallam, Basim (eds.). The Transformation of Nomadic Society in the Arab East. Cambridge: Cambridge University Press. pp. 33–43. ISBN 0521770572.
- Schumacher, Gottlieb (1886). Across the Jordan: Being an Exploration and Survey of Part of Hauran and Jaulan. London: Richard Bentley and Son.
- Schumacher, Gottlieb (1888). The Jaulân: Surveyed for the German Society for the Exploration of the Holy Land. London: Richard Bentley and Son.
