= Vahan (Byzantine commander) =

Byzantine Armenian military leader (d. 636)

Vahan Վահան
- Died: 636; Yarmuk
- Military career
- Allegiance: Byzantine Empire
- Service years: 602-636
- Commands: Field commander in Yarmuk
- Conflicts: Battle of the Yarmuk (636) †

Vahan (Armenian: Վահան) was a Byzantine military leader of Armenian origin. He was probably killed shortly after the Battle of Yarmuk in 636.

Vahan, an Armenian who had been the garrison commander of Emesa and served as magister militum per Orientem during the Byzantine–Sasanian War of 602–628, was the overall field commander at the Yarmuk. While Vahan and part of his forces avoided destruction in the battle itself, they were pursued and killed by the Arab mobile guard during their subsequent retreat to Damascus, although other accounts state that a disgraced Vahan may have retired to a monastery in Sinai.

Arab sources emphasise the "noble and righteous conduct" of Vahan compared to other Roman commanders. Claims that Vahan or his soldiers had rebelled against Emperor Heraclius prior to Yarmouk are likely to be smears intended to pin the blame for the defeat on the Armenian.

== Negotiations with Rashiduns ==
Muslim sources record a conversation between Vahan and the Arab General Khalid ibn al-Walid before the battle of Yarmouk:

Vahan: We know that it is your misguided beliefs that have brought you out of your lands. We will give you wine, women, and wealth if you return to your lands and promise to raise your arms in defense of my empire when I call upon you. I know you Bedouins will accept these concessions.

Khalid: "In the name of God, the Most Gracious, the Most Merciful. There is no god but Allah, and Muhammad is his slave and messenger, whom Jesus son of Mary prophesied. You speak of wine, women, and wealth as if we are driven by lust and greed. But know this, O Caesar: We are a people whom God has honored through Islam. We were lost, and He guided us. We were divided, and He united us. We were weak, and He gave us strength. We do not fight for gold nor for the pleasures of this world. We fight to bring justice, to liberate the oppressed, and to raise high the Word of God. Your offers are insults to men who carry the Qur’an in their hearts and the sword in their hands. You see us as Bedouins, but I tell you, we are the soldiers of God. And we have come not for your treasures, but to break the chains of tyranny your empire has wrapped around the necks of men. You offer us servitude. We offer you Islam. Accept it and you will find peace. Refuse, and we shall meet you on the battlefield — where you will see what it means to face men who love death as you love life.

Vahan: “You dare speak to me of justice, desert-dweller? You — a sand-swept savage whose people lived in filth and ignorance until yesterday? You come here preaching about God as if you have a monopoly on truth, when your kind barely knew how to read before your so-called prophet started chanting verses in a cave like a madman. Then come — and I will drown your martyrs in their own blood. Your faith may promise you paradise, but my empire promises you annihilation. You will not just be defeated — you will be forgotten. Look around you, Bedoiun! You stand at the gates of a civilization a thousand years old. We are Rum — and you are nothing but wind and dust. Crawl back to your wastelands, or I will feed your corpse to the carrion birds before the sun sets. We will annihilate you!"

Khalid ibn al-Walid then began reciting the Koran and spoke of Muhammad. He then recited poetry.

"You have spoken with pride

But pride is the mask of a soul drowning in fear. We do not fear you, your throne, nor your legions. We fear only the One who created you — and will end you. You offer us the filth of the world — wine, women, and coin. We offer you something far greater: Submission to the One God, and the chance to be free. But you have chosen mockery over mercy. Arrogance over truth. And so, negotiations are over. Tomorrow, we will meet on the field. And when the dust settles, you will know whether it is Rum that conquers — or the Word of God. Prepare your soul, Caesar

For I have already prepared mine."

“Then bring your faith and your God, Bedouin,”

stated Vahan.

“I will bury them beside your bones.”

negotiations promptly ended there.
