= Walter Kaegi =

American historian (1937–2022)

Walter Emil Kaegi (November 8, 1937, New Albany, Indiana – February 24, 2022) was a historian and scholar of Byzantine history, professor of history at the University of Chicago, and a Voting Member of The Oriental Institute. He received his B.A. from Haverford College in 1959 and his PhD from Harvard University in 1965. He was known for his researches on the period from the 4th through 11th centuries with a special interest in the advance of Islam, interactions with religion and thought, and military subjects. Kaegi is also distinguished for analyzing the Late Roman period in European and Mediterranean context, and has written extensively on Roman, Vandal, Byzantine and Muslim occupation of North Africa. He was known also as the co-founder of the Byzantine Studies Conference and the editor of the journal Byzantinische Forschungen.

== Bibliography ==
=== 1970s-1980s ===
- Byzantium and the Decline of Rome. Princeton: Princeton University Press, 1968; reprinted, 1970.
- Byzantine Military Unrest 471–843: An Interpretation. Amsterdam & Las Palmas: A.M. Hakkert, 1981.
- Army, Society and Religion in Byzantium. London: Variorum Revised Editions & Reprints, 1982.
- Some Thoughts on Byzantine Military Strategy. Hellenic Studies Lecture for Ball State University. Brookline, MA.: Hellenic College Press, 1983.
- Byzantium and the Trans-Saharan Gold Trade: A Cautionary Note. Graeco-Arabica, vol. 3 (1984), 95–100.

=== 1990s ===
- Procopius the Military Historian. Byzantinische Forschungen 15 (1990) 53-85.
- Byzantium and the Early Islamic Conquests. Cambridge, Eng.: Cambridge University Press, 1992. Paperback, 1995.
- Byzantine Logistics: Problems and Perspectives. In collective volume, ed. by John A. Lynn, entitled The Feeding of Mars (Boulder:Westview Press, 1993) 39–55.
- The Capability of the Byzantine Army for Military Operations in Italy. In: Teodorico e i Goti, ed. by Antonio Carile (Ravenna: Longo Editore,1995) 79–99.
- Egypt on the Eve of the Muslim Conquest, Cambridge History of Egypt, ed. C. Petry (Cambridge: Cambridge University Press, 1998) pp 34–61.

=== 2000s ===
- Society and Institutions in Byzantine Africa. In: Ai confini dell'impero. Storia, arte e archeologia della Sardegna bizantina. (Cagliari, Sardinia, Italy: M & T Sardegna, 2002) pp. 15–28.
- Heraclius Emperor of Byzantium. Cambridge University Press (2003).
- Confronting Islam: Emperors versus Caliphs (641-c. 850). In: Cambridge History of the Byzantine Empire, (2008) 365-394.
- Muslim Expansion and Byzantine Collapse in North Africa. Cambridge University Press (2010).

== Research ==
Kaegi was most recently involved in several projects, notably on Muslim raids into Byzantine Anatolia. He was planning an investigation of the role of Byzantine concepts of strategy in the emergence of concepts of strategy in early Modern Europe. Kaegi's research interests also included Byzantine commercial relationships with the Arabian Peninsula on the eve of the Islamic conquests. Additionally, he was preparing an essay on Byzantium in the 7th century for an Oxford University Press handbook to Maximus the Confessor. An avid reader of Arnold J. Toynbee in his formative years, Kaegi was writing a reassessment of Toynbee as a Byzantine historian.
