= Dirar ibn al-Azwar =

Companion of the Islamic prophet Muhammad, Arabian warrior

Diraar bin Al-Azwar
- Born: Mecca; Arabian Peninsula
- Died: presumably 640; Jordan Valley, Rashidun Caliphate.
- Relatives: Khawlah bint al-Azwar (Sister); Banu Asad ibn Khuzaymah branch of Mudar (clan); Adnanite (tribe)
- Military career
- Allegiance: Rashidun Caliphate.
- Branch: Rashidun army
- Service years: ? - 639 (disputed)
- Nicknames: al-Azwar, The Warrior or The Champion, Killer of Romans
- Units: Rashidun army Rashidun cavalry
- Conflicts: Ridda Wars; Muslim conquest of Syria; Muslim conquest of Persia; Muslim conquest of Egypt

Dhiraar ibn al-Azwar Al-Asadi (Arabic: ضرار بن الأزور الأسدي) also spelled as Diraar or Dirar (original name Dhiraar ibn Malik) was a skilled warrior who participated in the early Muslim conquests and a companion of the Islamic prophet Muhammad. Dhiraar was known to his tribe as al-Azwar.

Dhiraar was feared by the Byzantine army and was given the nickname "the Barechested Warrior" or "the Barechested Champion" for his tendency to fight without armor or upper garments. Dhiraar is mostly known for killing three dozen enemy commanders in the Battle of Ajnadayn, blocking the enemy retreat in the Battle of Yarmouk, and killing more than a hundred soldiers single-handedly in the siege of Oxyrhynchus Bahnasa.

Dhiraar was a member of the elite Rashidun cavalry unit and also a dueling specialist of the Rashidun Army operating mostly under the famous general Khalid ibn al-Walid, who trusted him with various tasks during the Ridda Wars and the Muslim conquests of the Levant, Persia, North Africa and Egypt. Historians agree that Dhiraar died due to the Plague of Amwas during the later stage of the Levant campaign. Muslim scholars and chroniclers honored Dhiraar due to his status as a companion of Muhammad; during the modern era, his descendants, known as the Dharri tribe, spread mostly throughout Iraq.

== Biography ==
Dhiraar belonged to the Arab tribe of Banu Asad. He was the son of one of its chieftains, known as al-Azwar Malik, the sixth generation descendant of Asad ibn Khuzaymah, the progenitor of the Asad tribe, who descended in the seventh generation from Adnan. (Note: Dhiraar full lineage nisba is Malik ibn Aws Jadhimah ibn Rabia ibn Malik ibn Sha'labah ibn Asad ibn Khuzaymah ibn Mudrikah ibn Ilyas ibn Mudar ibn Nizar ibn Maad ibn Adnan al-Asadi.(Arabic: ضرار بن الأزور وهو مالك بن أوس بن جذيمة بن ربيعة بن مالك بن ثعلبة بن أسد بن دودان بن أسد بن خزيمة بن مدركة بن إلياس بن مضر بن نزار بن معد بن عدنان، الأسدي)) Dhiraar became Muslim after the Battle of the Trench, as he was sent with Tulayha ibn Khuwaylid by the Asad clan; he then urged the clan to embrace Islam after his visit to the prophet of Islam. Dhiraar's family was among the first converts to Islam. Muhammad admonished that it is allowed for Muslims to possess property which he gained before he convert to Islam. It is recorded that Dhiraar was known as a very wealthy person. It was said that he possessed a thousand camels (Note: Baghawi transmit the long narrative chains which came from Dhiraar himself which recorded by Al-Tabarani. however Ibn Hajar al-Asqalani rejected the authenticity of the dialogue contained in the narration, although he did not criticize regarding the case that Dhiraar's possession of thousand camels which came in the background of the dialogue narration).

During the initial period of the Ridda Wars, Dhiraar was a tax collector. He was one of the Arabian clansmen from Asad that stayed loyal and pledged allegiance to the Islamic government in Medina, with its newly appointed caliph Abu Bakr. Dhiraar showed his loyalty by warning and chastising the conduct of the peoples who rebelled against the caliphate. Later, he participated as a scout in the elite Rashidun cavalry led by the general Khalid ibn al-Walid. Dhiraar was sent to quell a rebellion. He was sent by Khalid to lead a detachment consisting of Banu Tamim warriors to confront Malik ibn Nuwayra, chief of the Bani Yarbu, a Banu Tamim clan, on accusations of apostasy. Dhiraar participated in Battle of Yamama, where he testified that around 7,000 followers of Musaylima were killed on the battlefield, the plain of Aqraba, while 7,000 others were killed inside their fortress, in a garden called "the garden of death".

=== Conquest of Iraq ===
Dhiraar participated in the first Muslim conquest of Persia under Khalid ibn al-Walid, which occurred immediately after the Ridda wars. Dhiraar played a pivotal role in the Battle of Walaja, as he was assigned to be one of two cavalry commanders tasked with leading detachments of Rashidun cavalry to strike the advancing Sassanid army from the rear, trapping them in a double envelopment maneuver strategy designed by Khalid.

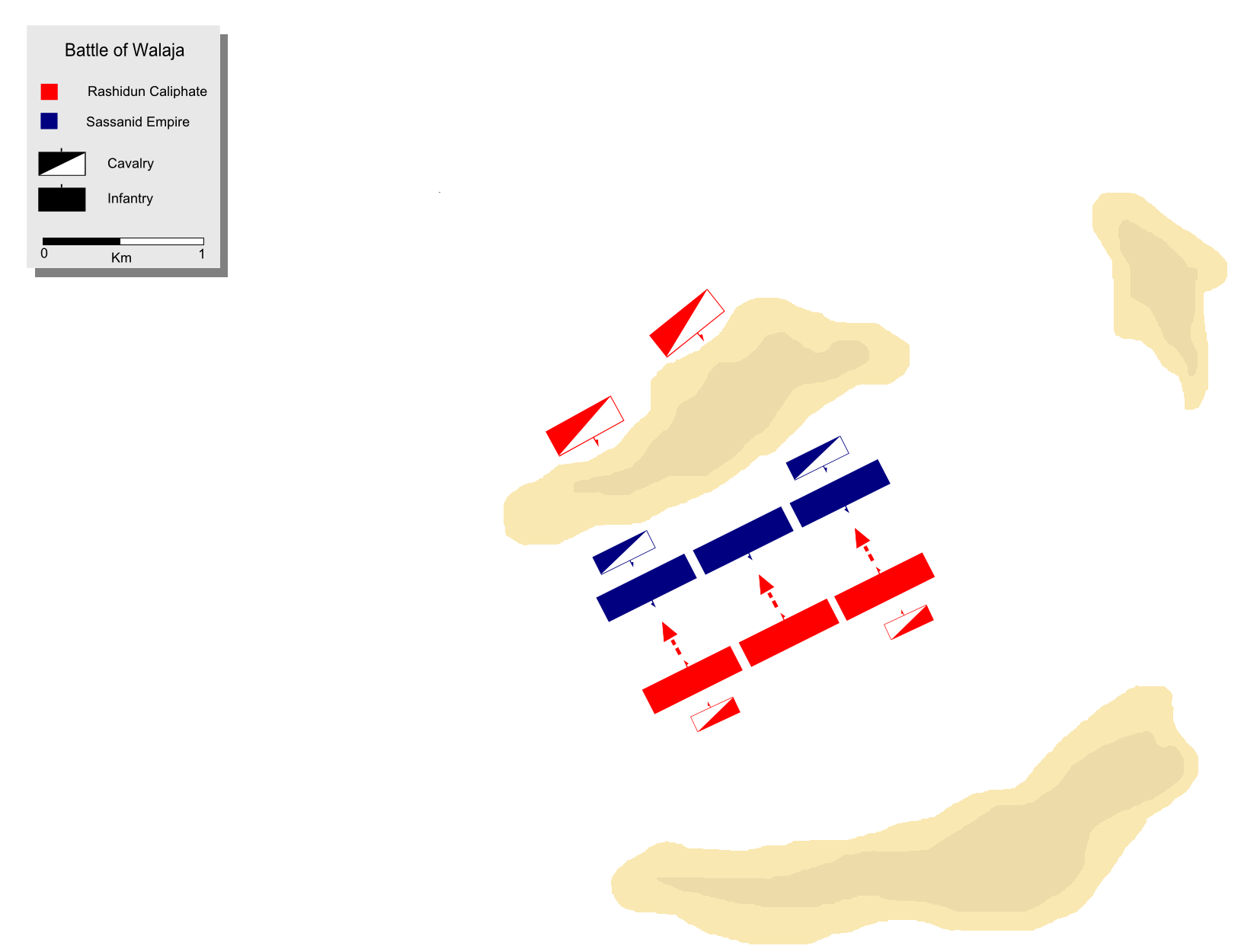
Khalid led main army to engage and bait the Sassanid while cavalry of Dhiraar and Suwaid ibn Muqrin hiding behind the hill

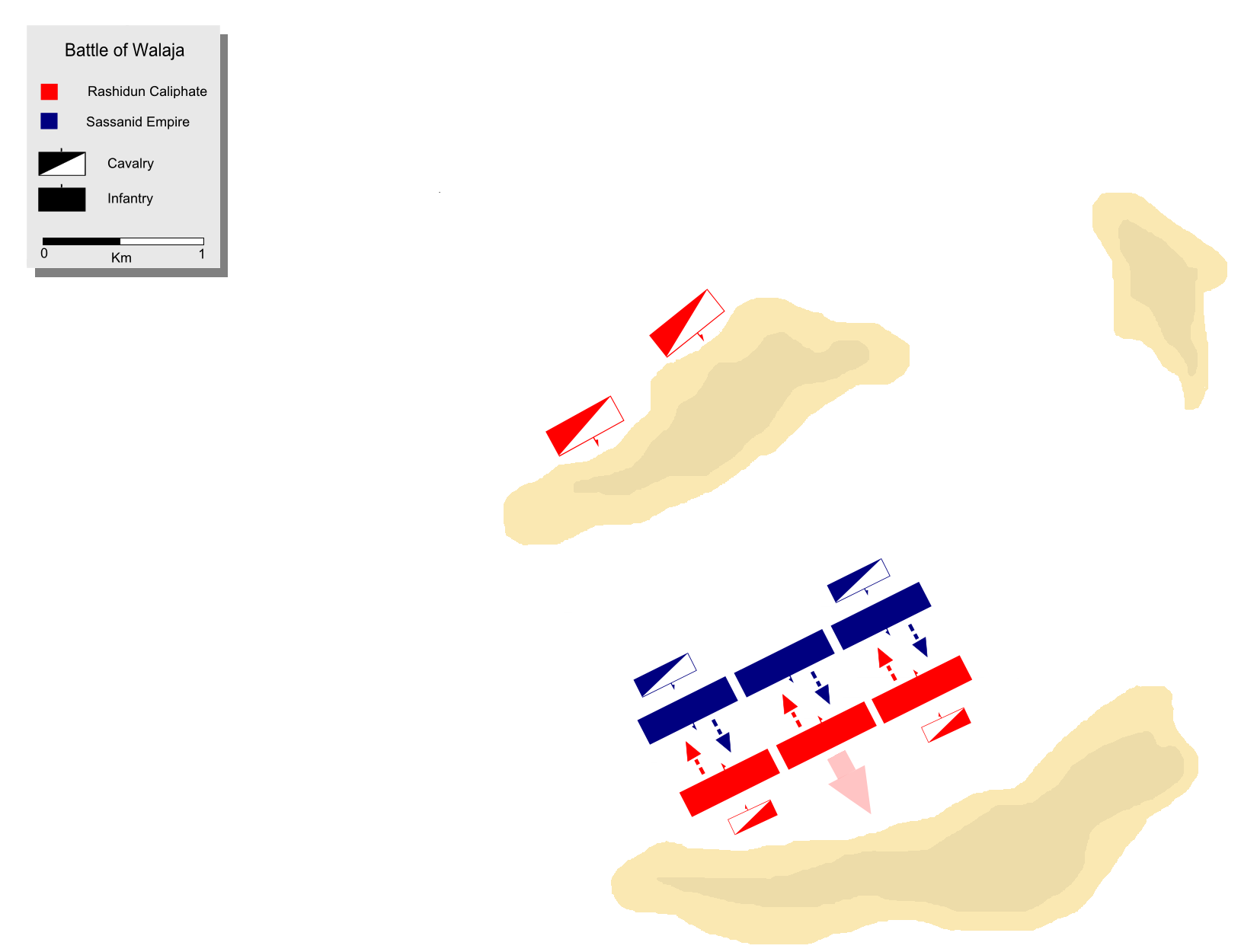
Sassanids launched counter-attack, on Khalid's instructions the Muslim withdrawing their position to lure the Sassanid advance.

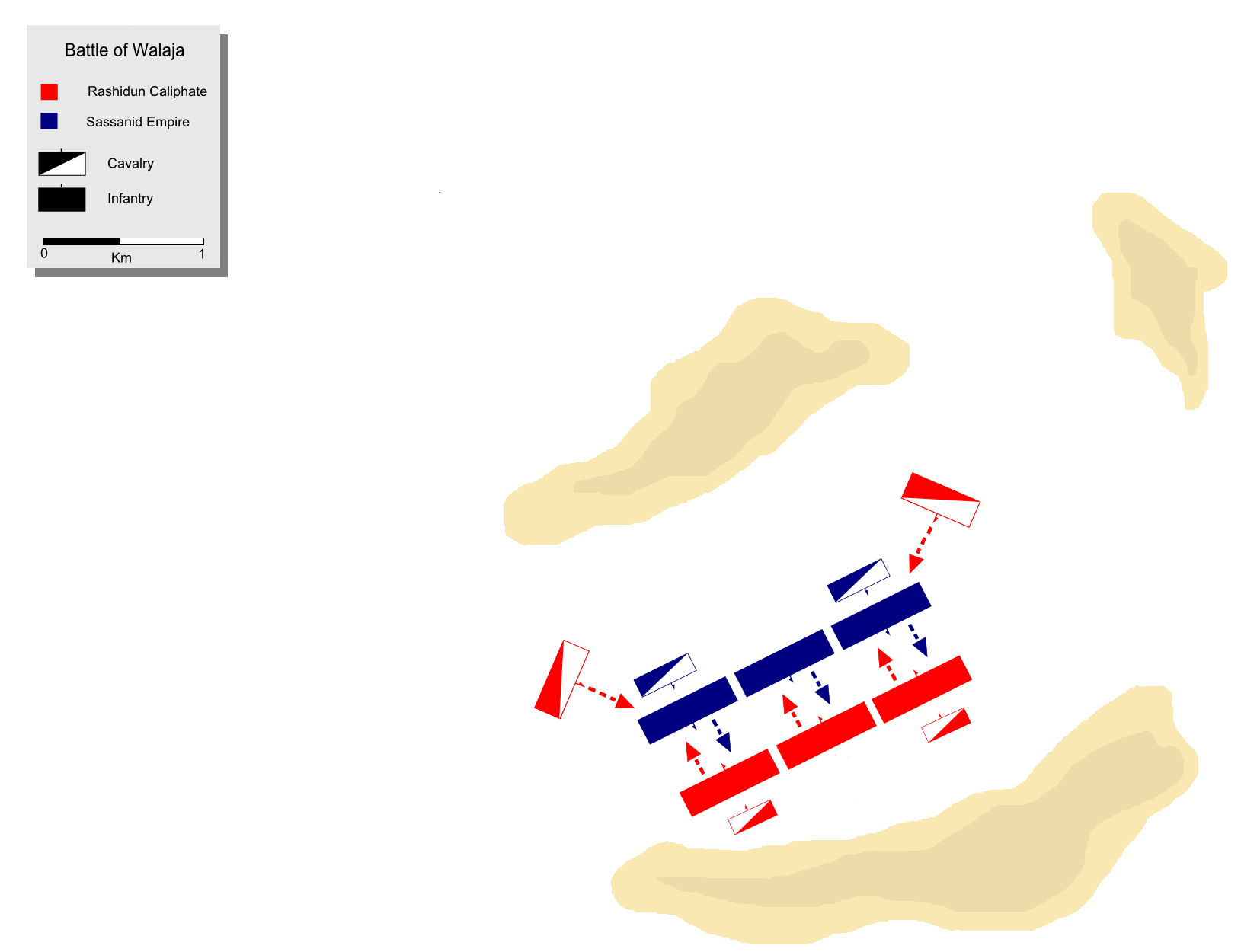
Dhiraar and Suwaid ibn Muqrin cavalry launching envelopment attack.

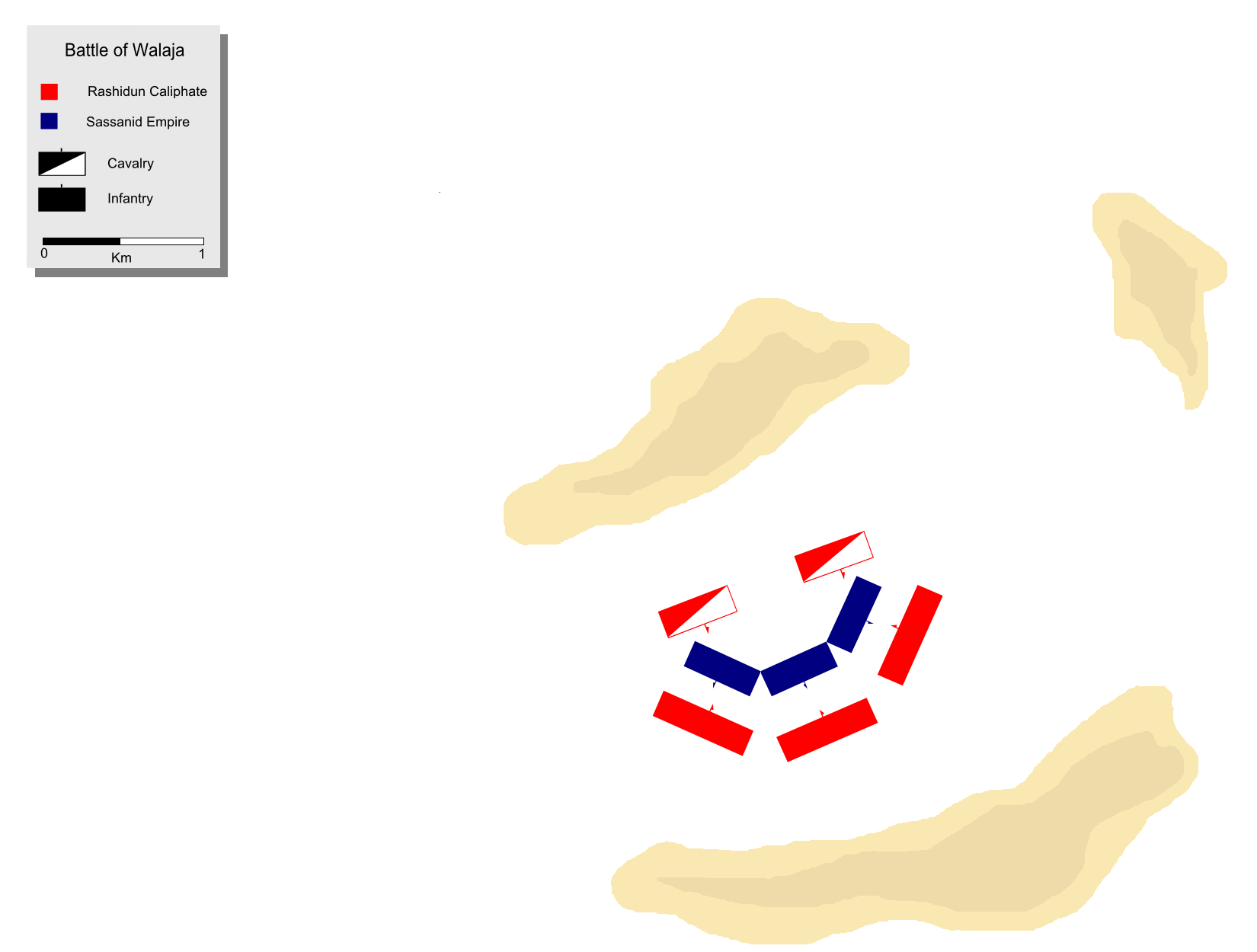
Muslim cavalry and infantry complete the encirclement of the Persian army.

During the battle of Hira, Dhiraar and Ayas ibn Qubaisah were tasked to subdue the fortress of al-Qasr al-Abyad; Dhiraar asked the fortress to surrender. However, the fortress garrison resisted and attacked the Rashidun soldiers under Dhiraar with "cylindrical ceramic rollers". (Note: Blankinship did not really sure about the exact meaning about the materials used by the city defenders to defend against Dhiraar, except relying on solely the original translation interpretation.) In response, Dhiraar ordered his soldiers to shower the fortress wall with arrows, and continued to storm the people outside the fortress. His forces eventually breached inside and captured the houses and monasteries inside al-Qasr al-Abyad. This caused the residents to immediately surrender to Dhiraar.

Later, Dhiraar was recorded along with Dhiraar ibn al-Khattab, Al-Muthanna ibn Haritha, and Dhiraar ibn al-Muqarrin as being appointed as quarter commanders of the Rashidun garrison in al-Sib. Dhiraar and the others mounted raids that penetrated into an area that reached the banks of the Tigris river.

=== Conquest of Levant ===
The Rashidun army left the capital Medina probably in the autumn of 633 or at the beginning of 634. They first engaged and defeated the Byzantines at Dathin on February 4; after that, Emperor Heraclius, then stationed in Emesa (now Homs, Syria), had reinforcements sent south to protect Caesarea Maritima. As a possible reaction, commander Khalid ibn al-Walid was ordered to aid Abu Ubayda ibn al-Jarrah in Syria. Sometime before the Siege of Emesa, a Byzantine commander from Baalbek named Harbees collided with patrolling Rashidun troops which were led by Dhiraar, Amr ibn Ma'adi Yakrib, Abdul Rahman ibn Abi Bakr, Rabia ibn Amr, and Malik Al-Ashtar. The forces of Harbees were swiftly demolished by the Rashidun troops under Amr. Dhiraar and Amr then continued by leading more than 5,000 cavalry troops to join Maysarah ibn Masruq in besieging Homs.

==== Battle of Ajnadayn ====
According to George Nafziger, Dhiraar accomplished several impressive feats during the Battle of Ajnadayn, where he reportedly slew multiple Byzantine champions, including two provincial governors. At one point, Dhiraar impetuously confronted Khalid and asked:

"Why are we waiting when Allah, the Most High, is on our side? By Allah, our enemies will think that we are afraid of them. Order the attack, and we shall attack with you." (Note: This dialogue recording was not generally accepted as it was only found in the records of Al-Waqidi who has been criticized by many scholars in terms of Hadith narration field.)

Al-Waqidi recorded another event in which Dhiraar duelled against Vahan. Dhiraar unfastened and discarded his armor and upper garments during the duel, thus continuing bare-chested. In a very fierce duel, Dhiraar eventually speared Vahan through the chest, killing him. He then continued on, charging through the Byzantine ranks and killing at least three dozen Byzantine soldiers alone, according to witnesses. The deaths of the Byzantine commanders sowed disorder and loss of morale among the Byzantine ranks, which Khalid used to his strategic advantage.

==== Further battles in Levant ====
After the defeat of the Byzantine-allied Ghassanids by April 24, Khalid's force was able to enter Bosra, Syria almost unopposed. Dhiraar was captured once by Byzantine forces during the Battle of Eagle Pass, which occurred during the siege of Damascus. Shortly after, he was rescued by a team led by his sister, Khawla bint al-Azwar. (Note: Some commentaries criticize the authenticity of Khawlah's rescue because it was recorded without citations approved by the scholars of that era and only by al-Waqidi, who has been criticized by Ahmad ibn Hanbal, al-Shafi’i, al-Bukhari and others as unreliable.) Dhiraar then participated in the siege of Damascus. Later in the same year, Dhiraar was appointed by Khalid to be cavalry commander during the battle of Fahl.

During the siege of al-Rastan, it is recorded that the supreme commander of Rashidun forces, Abu Ubayda, employed a certain plan that allowed Dhiraar and about 20 warriors which included al-Musayyab ibn Najaba, Dhu'l Kala al-Himyari, Amr ibn Ma'adi Yakrib al-Zubaydi, Hashim ibn Utba, Qays ibn Makshuh, Abd al-Rahman ibn Abi Bakr al-Siddiq, Malik al-Ashtar, and others to enter the city. They were to cause a riot inside which would throw the entire city into confusion, then open the gate from inside to allow the Muslim forces waiting outside to overwhelm the defenses, thus allowing the city to be captured despite its very strong fortifications.

==== Battle of Yarmouk ====
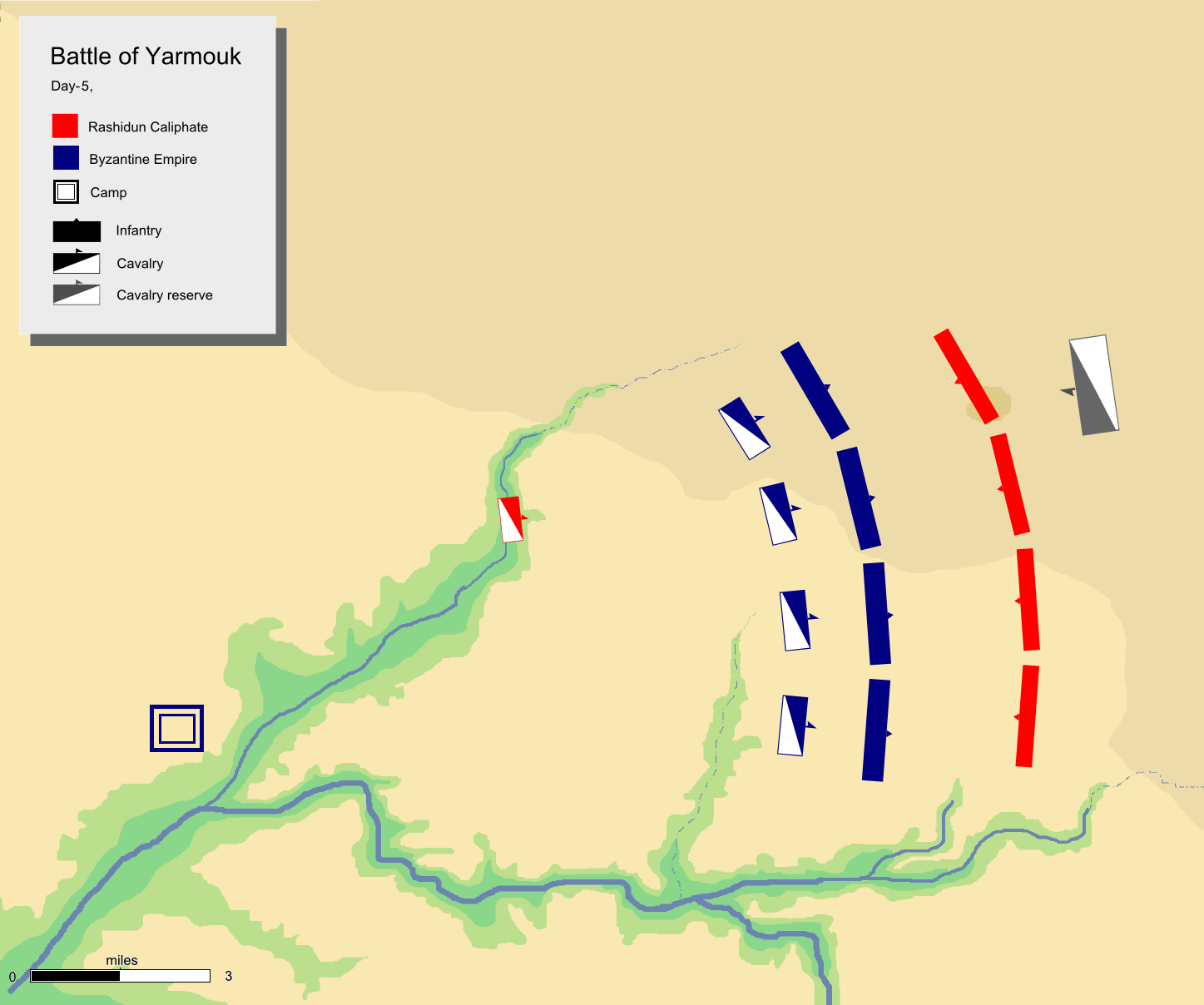
fifth day's deployment. Dhiraar's troops waiting on the far left to ambush routed Byzantine army.

In the battle of Yarmouk, Dhiraar was placed on the left wing commanded by Yazid ibn Abi Sufyan, leading his personal squadron among a dozen other squadrons on the left wing. During this battle, Dhiraar served largely in a unit of elite cavalry called the Mobile Guards, which was specifically tasked with plugging the gaps between Muslim ranks to avoid enemy penetration. It is recorded that in one particular clash, as a rank of Muslims fell back at the Byzantine onslaught, Dhiraar grouped together with Ikrimah ibn Abi Jahl, stood firm with 400 men holding the deserted line, and successfully defended the Muslim position until the fleeing Muslim ranks returned to the battlefield and reinforced the position again. The circumstances were expounded on in Al-Tabari's comprehensive history, wherein Ikrimah is recorded as saying:

"Would I fight the Messenger of God in every place, yet flee from you today?! Who will take an oath (to fight) to the death?!"

Al-Harith ibn Hisham and Dhiraar ibn Al-Azwar both swore an oath along with 400 notable men and knights. They fought in front of Khalid's command tent until all of them were disabled by wounds. Many of them, including Ikrimah, died after the clash due to heavy wounds, although some, like Dhiraar, were able to recover.

On the final day of the battle, Dhiraar played a prominent role when Khalid assigned him to capture a bridge at Ayn al-Dhakar to safely cross the deep gorges of the ravines of Wadi ar-Raqqad with 500 soldiers. He was then ordered by Khalid to set an ambush there to eliminate the Byzantine armies who had been routed and who intended to use this bridge to withdraw. The next day, Dhiraar moved with 500 mounted troops around the northern flank of the Byzantines and captured the bridge. The plan was successful as the Byzantines retreated onto this path, where Dhiraar had been waiting for them at Wadi ar-Raqqad Bridge. The Byzantines were surrounded on all sides now. Some fell off into the deep ravines, others tried to escape into the water, only to be smashed on the rocks below, and still others were killed in their attempted escape.

=== Battle of Qadisiyyah ===
Later, Caliph Umar instructed a portion of the Rashidun troops from Yarmouk to be transferred to Iraq as reinforcements for Sa'd ibn Abi Waqqas in the Battle of al-Qādisiyyah against the Sassanid Empire. Dhiraar was counted among them. At this stage, Ya'qubi has recorded that along with Dhiraar, bin Al-Azwar, Amr ibn Ma'adi Yakrib, Tulayha, and Kurt ibn Jammah al-Abdi discovered the corpse of Rostam Farrokhzad, the highest commander of the Sassanid army, during this battle. The death of Rostam shocked the entire Sassanid side, which prompted Sa'd to instruct a general assault by all the Muslim soldiers.

=== Conquest of Africa ===
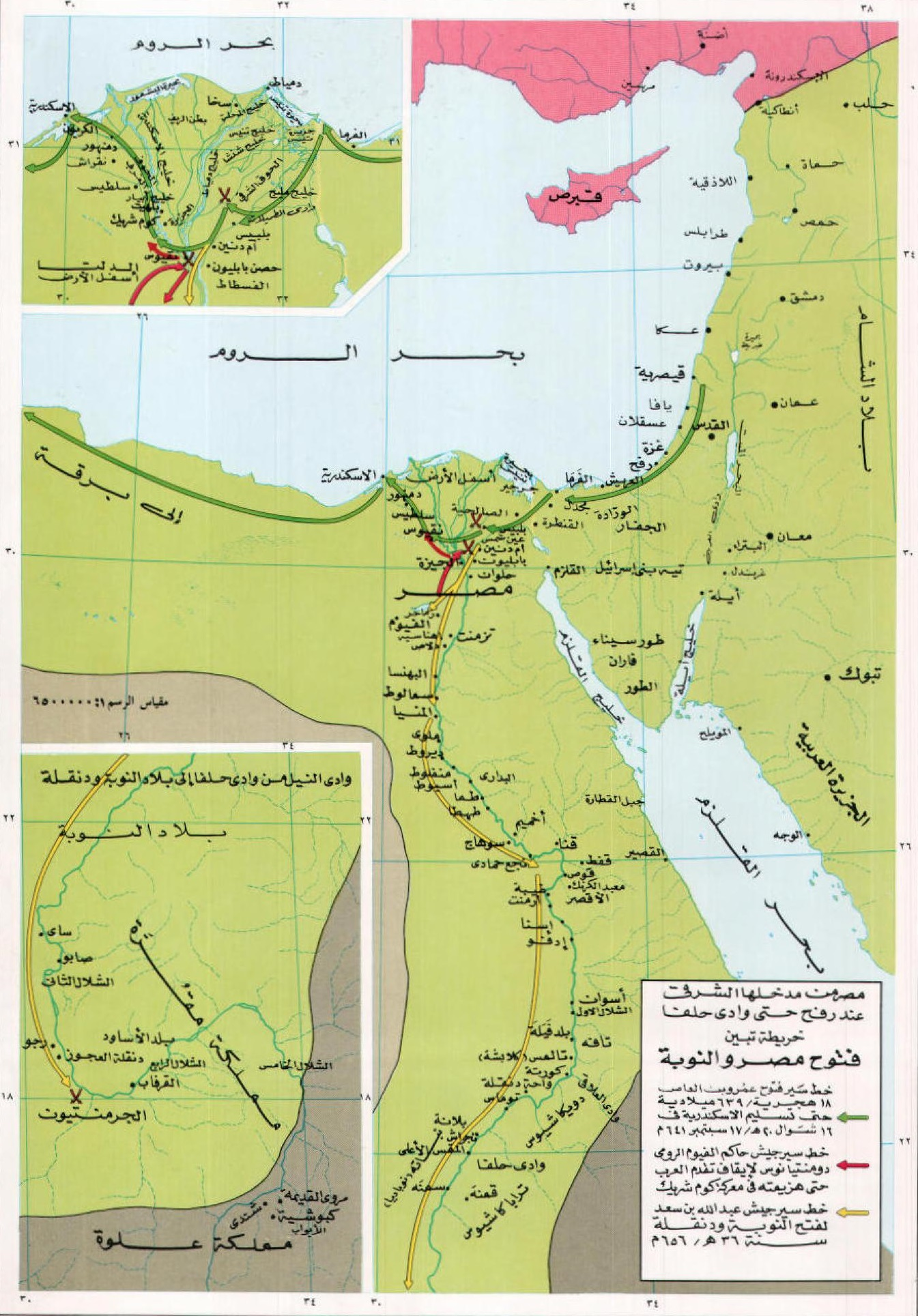
Path of the Islamic armies in Egypt and Nubia during the reign of the second Caliph Omar Ibn Al-Khattab.

Later, according to Waqidi, during the Muslim conquest of Egypt, Dhiraar participated in a campaign under Miqdad ibn Aswad that pacified several areas in the al-Gharbia region, starting from Kafr Tanah (in modern day Dakahlia Governorate) and Tinnis. Then Miqdad continued his march, leading forty horsemen which included Dhiraar. As they reached Damietta, Miqdad found the city was fortified by a man named al-Hammuk, an uncle of Al-Muqawqis. Al-Hammuk fortified the city and closed the gates as Miqdad besieged the city. As Damietta subdued, Miqdad was appointed to govern the city.

Later, Dhiraar was involved in the Muslim campaign to Bahnasa. Amr ibn al-As sent Dhiraar and the Muslim army under his command to meet the Sudanese Christian auxiliaries of Beja. (Note: The compilation records about the conquest of Sudan and southern Egypt were compiled in Futuhat Bahnasa and records of al-Maqrizi) Before the battle, the Rashidun army camped in Dashur. Benjamin Hendrickx reported that the African Christians had mustered around 20,000 Sudanese symmachoi corps, (Note: Symmachos were a successor of Foederati auxiliary troops in Roman empire that existed around 400-650 AD. In this case, they consisted of native black Sudanese auxiliary units of Byzantine.) 1,300 elephant-mounted archers, and anti-cavalry units named al-Quwwad which were armed with iron staffs, led by a Patrician named Batlus. Meanwhile, al-Maqqari even stated there was a 50,000-strong Christian army of Byzantine-Sudanese alliance at the "Battle of Darishkur".

The record of al-Maqrizi stated that in this conflict, Dhiraar along with Miqdad ibn Aswad, Zubayr ibn al-Awwam, and Uqba ibn Amir each commanded Muslim cavalry facing the elephant corps led by the Byzantine exarchate commander Batlus. The Rashidun cavalry were armed with spears which, after the tips were soaked in santonin plants and sulphur, ignited in flames. The flaming spears were used to drive the elephants away in terror, while the elephant riders were thrown from the elephant's back and crushed underfoot. Meanwhile, the al-Quwwad warriors were routed by Rashidun cavalry soldiers who used seized chain weapons to overcome the iron staffs used by the Byzantine al-Quwwad corps.

==== Siege of Bahnasa City ====
After the Rashidun victory in Darishkur, the Byzantine Sudanese forces fled to Bahnasa and locked the gates. The Muslims soon besieged the town as the Byzantine side was reinforced by an arrival of 50,000, according to the report of al-Maqqari. The siege dragged for months, until Khalid ibn al-Walid commanded Zubayr ibn al-Awwam, Dhiraar ibn al-Azwar and other commanders to intensify the siege, assigning them to lead around 10,000 Companions of the Prophet, with 70 among them being veterans of the battle of Badr. They besieged the city for 4 months as Dhiraar led 200 horsemen, Zubayr ibn al-Awwam led 300 horsemen, while the other commanders such as Miqdad, Abdullah ibn Umar and Uqba ibn Amir al-Juhani led similar numbers to Dhiraar, each commanding 200 horsemen. The Byzantines and their Copt allies showered the Rashidun army with arrows and stones until the Rashidun overcame the defenders. The Rashidun army managed to breach the gate, storm the city, and force the surrender of the inhabitants. (Note: The first version narrated the siege of Bahnasa were led by Khalid ibn al-Walid, who also brought an ex Sassanid Marzban and his 2,000 Persian convert soldiers in this campaign. The Persian Marzban suggested to Khalid to form a suicide squad who will carry a wooden box filled with mixture of sulphur and oil and placing it at the gates, ignited it and blasting the gates(or melting the iron gate, according to the original translation), allowing the Muslim army to enter the city.) (Note: The second version were the Muslim army led by Qays ibn Harith without much details of how the Muslims managed to subdue the city. However, this source mention that Qays ibn Harith name were used temporarily to rename Oxyrhynchus for while to honor his deeds in this campaign, before being renamed to be al-Bahnasa.) Dhiraar, the first to emerge, came out of the battle with his entire body stained with blood, confessing that he personally killed around 160 Byzantine soldiers during the battle. According to chronicles, the siege of Bahnasa was so fierce that in this battle alone, 5,000 Companions of the prophet perished; thousands of their tombs can still be seen in the modern day.

=== Historical death controversy ===
It is widely accepted by historical consensus that Dhiraar died in Syria from the Plague of Amwas, the plague that killed many other Companions of Muhammad, including Abu Ubayda ibn al-Jarrah. The year of his death is believed to be 18 AH/640 AD and his final resting place is in Syria. The tomb shrine believed to belong to Dhiraar is located in the town of Deir Alla in the Central Jordan Valley, in northwestern Jordan. It is a modern mosque with a wide courtyard and a garden decorated with trees.

Still, other accounts of Dhiraar ibn al-Azwar's death exist. For instance, Ibn 'Abd al-Barr said he fell at the Battle of Ajnadayn. This is contrary to al-Waqidi's report which said he fell at the Battle of Yamama.Al-Tabari discussed in his book the conflicting reports of two versions of his death. The first asserts that Dhiraar was killed in the battle of Ajnadayn, while the other asserts that he in the battle of Yamama. Ya'qubi wrote that he lived long enough to witness the Battle of Qadisiyyah and that together with Tulayha, Amr ibn Ma'adi Yakrib and Kurt ibn Jammah al-Abdi, he discovered the corpse of Rostam Farrokhzād. Despite this, the chronicle of Ya'qubi has been plagued with skepticism due to his excessive Shi'i sympathies. (Note: Skepticism regarding Ya'qubi's works existed because he was accused of Shi'ite bias.)

Ibn Hajar al-Asqalani remarked in his work Fath al-Bari about Muhammad al-Bukhari's commentary that there was weakness in the narrative chain of the death of Dhiraar in Yamama. Ibn Hajar further surmised that there were two different persons called Dhiraar. The first was Dhiraar ibn al-Azwar from the Asad tribe and the other named Dhiraar ibn al-Khattab. Thus, some chroniclers like Abd al-Barr made the mistake of identifying those two different persons as one. Although the confusion was evident here, the older chroniclers such as Abu Ismail al-Azdi and Sayf ibn Umar were conscious of the existence of two different Dhiraars, but they also recorded that both Dhiraar al-Azwar and Dhiraar ibn al-Khattab were present in the Syrian campaign, particularly at the Battle of Yarmouk, thus dismissing al-Barr and al-Waqidi's claims. Mashhoor bin Hassan al-Salman, a Jordanian Hadith expert and pupil of Muhammad Nasiruddin al-Albani, has warned in his book against the tradition authored by Waqidi. Al-Salman regards the death of Dhiraar in the battle of Yamama as inauthentic narration. Meanwhile, Mahmud Shakir also recorded that both Dhiraar ibn al-Azwar and Dhiraar ibn al-Khattab lived long enough past the battle of Yamama to attend the battle of Qadisiyyah.

== Legacy ==
As a companion of the prophet, traditions of Muhammad narrated by Dhiraar were accepted as Hadith. A certain Hadith regarding milking was transmitted by Dhiraar from the authority of Hanad as-Sirri, student of Sulaiman al-Aʽmash. Dhiraar also narrated a hadith straight from Muhammad regarding wealth and possessions in view of Islam, which was recorded in Al-Mustadrak ala al-Sahihayn written by Al-Hakim al-Nishapuri.

Dirar ibn al-Azwar Mosque was built in his commemoration and is located in the northern part of the Jordan Valley, adjacent to the mausoleum of Abu Ubayda ibn al-Jarrah, in an area which witnessed the first battles between the Muslims and the Byzantine Empire.

The sword supposedly belonging to Dhiraar is now preserved in the Topkapı Palace Museum, Turkey.

The Al-Zarrar main battle tank used by the Pakistan Army is named in his honor.

Pakistan Air Force's No. 27 Tactical Attack Sqn also has adopted al-Zarrar as their call sign, and his warrior sketch outline as their squadron insignia.

=== Socio-political ===
Regarding the modern era historiographical study of the conquest of al-Bahnasa, Sudanese history researchers said the old chronicles from traditional History of Bahnasa Conquest supported the al-Maqrizi narration of the background for the Arab invasions of Sudan (Note: Wallis Budge, author of The English Sudan, its History and Monuments, Quoted Burckhardt that the narrations of the Bedja troops arrival of 50,000 were attested by well authenticated train of chain narrators from the traditional accounts themselves.), though MacMichaels doubts it. (Note: MacMichaels, author of History of the Arabs in Sudan, doubted this major conflict happened as he argued the first contact between the Sudanese with Arab Muslims are unlikely came this early, before Abdullah ibn Sa'd contacted with the Sudanese in 641, after the capture of Aswan However, Hendricxk mentioned that J. Jarry, and Vasilios Christides favored the Futuh of Bahnasa and argued it has strong factual standing, although the other correlated source mixed some historical facts with some myths from Ode of Antarah ibn Shaddad.) Nevertheless, al-Dukhayli mentioned there are several battle poetries regarding the battle of Darishkur that were allegedly recited by several Muslim leaders during the battle, such as Dhiraar, Zubayr ibn al-Awwam, al-Qa'qa' ibn Amr al-Tamimi, and others. Meanwhile, modern excavation and archaeological research teams from the Egyptian ministry also showed interest in the tombs of the Muslims fallen during the battle, and the alleged encampment of the Rashidun army during the campaign, in which Dhiraar participated. Dhiraar was a fluently accomplished poet who devoted many of his poetic narrations to his expression of Jihad and his Islamic stance. His work has been studied as the historical heritage of Iraq.

The Dharri clan, also known as the Zarari, are an Arabian tribe in modern day Iraq who can allegedly trace their ancestry to Dhiraar ibn al-Azwar.

=== In popular culture ===
Several 20th-century films made about Muslim conquests included Dhiraar in their cast:

- Syrian actor Ahmed Slan played the role of Dhiraar ibn al-Azwar in the first season of the series Khalid ibn al-Walid, directed by the Jordanian Mohammed Azizia.
- Egyptian actor Abdullah Ghaith played the role in the series Under the Shade of Swords by the Egyptian director Saeed Al-Rashidi.
- He is also portrayed in Swords of Arabia (Siyouf Al Arab), a historical drama series from Qatar, alongside his sister warrior Khawla bint Al-Azwar.

== Appendix ==
=== Primary sources ===
- Mustadrak al-Hakim; Al-Hakim al-Nishapuri
- Futuh as-Sham; Abu Ismail al Azdi
- Tarikh al-Rusul wal-Muluk; Muhammad ibn Jarir al-Tabari
- Futuh as-Sham; Waqidi
- Futuh al-Bahnasa; Taqī al-Dīn Abū al-'Abbās Aḥmad ibn 'Alī ibn 'Abd al-Qādir ibn Muḥammad al-Maqrīzī
- Sirah; Ibn Hisham
- Usd al-ghabah fi marifat al-Saḥabah; Ali ibn al-Athir
- Kitāb al-futūh al-kabīr wa-l-ridda; Sayf ibn Umar
- Mu'jam al-Buldan; Yaqut al-Hamawi
- Sahih al-Bukhari; Muhammad al-Bukhari
- Al-Isti'ab fi ma'rifat al-ashab; Ibn 'Abd al-Barr

=== Bibliography ===
- al-Dukhaylī, Ḥusayn ʻAlī ʻAbd al-Ḥusayn (2011). البنية الفنية لشعر الفتوحات الإسلامية في عصر صدر الإسلام [al-Bunyah al-fannīyah li-shiʻr al-futūḥāt al-Islāmīyah fī ʻaṣr ṣadr al-Islām/The artistic structure of the poetry of Islamic conquests in the era of early Islam]. Amman: Dār al-Ḥāmid lil-Nashr wa-al-tawzīʻ. p. 157. ISBN 9796500008936. OCLC 1184004713.
- H. Blumell, Lincoln (2012). "Epilogue. The Demise of Christian Oxyrhynchus". Lettered Christians (Biblical Studies). Brill. pp. 295–300. doi:10.1163/9789004180987_008. ISBN 9789004180987. "Futuh al-Bahnasa al Gharra, 'the conquest of Bahnasa, the blessed', by Muhammad ibn Muhammad al-Mu'izz"
- Hendrickx, Benjamin (2012). "THE BORDER TROOPS OF THE ROMAN-BYZANTINE SOUTHERN EGYPTIAN LIMES: PROBLEMS AND REMARKS ON THE ROLE OF THE AFRICAN AND 'BLACK' AFRICAN MILITARY UNITS". Ekklesiastikos Pharos. 94. hdl:10520/EJC128657.
- Kaegi, Walter Emil (1995), Byzantium and the Early Islamic Conquests, Cambridge University Press, ISBN 0-521-48455-3
- Muhammad al Dakruri (2020). "الدكرورى يكتب عن ضرار بن الأزور (الجزء الثانى)" [Al-Dakrouri writes about Dirar Ibn Al-Azwar (Part Two)]. Egypt 24.
- Mustafa, Murrad (2009). Kisah Hidup Abu Bakar AL-SHIDDIQ. Serambi ilmu semesta. p. 314. ISBN 9789790240681.
- Müzesi, Topkapı Sarayı; Dairesi, Hırka-i Saadet; Aydın, Hilmi; Uğurluel, Talha (2004). The Sacred Trusts: Pavilion of the Sacred Relics, Topkapı Palace Museum, Istanbul The Sacred Trusts: Pavilion of the Sacred Relics, Topkapi Palace Museum, Istanbul, Topkapı Sarayı Müzesi (illustrated, reprint ed.). Topkapi Museum Turkey: Tughra Books. ISBN 1932099727.
- Nicolle, David (1994), Yarmuk 636 A.D.: The Muslim Conquest of Syria, Osprey Publishing, ISBN 1-85532-414-8
- Norris, H. T. (1986). "THE FUTŪḤ AL-BAHNASĀ: And its relation to pseudo-"Maġāzī" and "Futūḥ" literature, Arabic "Siyar" and Western Chanson de Geste in the Middle Ages". Quaderni di Studi Arabi. 4: 76–78. JSTOR 25802579.
- Zubaidi, Ahmad ibn Ahmad; Hashim, Muhammad Salam; Sharif, Muhammad Mahdi (2002). مختصر صحيح البخاري المسمى التجريد الصريح لاحكام الجامع الصحيح Concise volume of Al Bukhari correct tradition. دار الكتب العلمية،. p. 706. ISBN 9782745135131.
- Al-Zubayri, Abu 'Abdallah Mus'ab ibn 'Abdallah ibn Mus'ab (1953). Kitab Nasab Quraysh (in Arabic). Cairo: Dar al-Ma'arif.
- منان, عتاب (2020). "مقارنة الأداء المالي للمصارف الإسلامية والتقليدية في الأسواق الناشئة (بالغة الانجليزية" [Comparing the financial performance of Islamic and conventional banks in emerging markets (in English)]. مجلة الاسکندرية للبحوث المحاسبية (مجلة الاسکندرية للبحوث المحاسبية) (in Arabic). 4 (2). doi:10.21608/aljalexu.2020.106078. S2CID 225896422.
