= Jewish Settlement Police =

Auxiliary police force in Mandatory Palestine

- משטרת היישובים העבריים
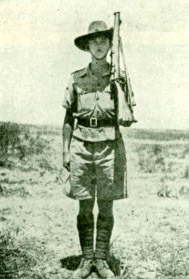
- Jewish Settlement Policeman, 1942
- Active: 1936–1948
- Disbanded: 1948
- Country: Mandatory Palestine
- Branch: Notrim
- Type: Auxiliary police
- Role: Security police, law enforcement, paramilitary training
- Size: 15,000 (1940); 1,929 (1947); 2,000 (1948)
- Part of: Palestine Police Force
- Garrison/HQ: Jewish settlements in Palestine
- Engagements: 1936–1939 Arab revolt in Palestine

Commanders
- Notable commanders: Ariel Sharon

A ghaffir (special policeman) corporal, 1942, and a ghaffir cap badge.

The Jewish Settlement Police (JSP) (Note: Hebrew: משטרת היישובים העבריים, romanized: Mishteret Ha-Yishuvim Ha-Ivri'yim) was a division of the Notrim established in Mandatory Palestine in 1936, during the 1936-39 Arab revolt.

== History ==
At the end of 1940, the JSP had about 15,000 members. A field army based on the force was estimated to be 16,000 men and women strong in 1946. According to a statement made by the Palestine Government in June 1947 and referenced by the United Nations Palestine Commission, the force itself was 1,929 men strong at the time. In early 1948 the force was about 2,000 strong.

The JSP cooperated with the British to form a joint British-Jewish unit known as the Special Night Squads. These were commanded by a "fervent Christian Zionist" British officer called Orde Wingate, who was posted to Palestine in 1936. The Special Night Squads fought Arab guerrillas who attacked the Iraq Petroleum Company pipeline.

The Haganah used the force as a "Training Centre" and put as many of its members through the JSP as possible: 13,455 between its formation and the end of 1945. The British authorities provided special uniforms, guns, light trucks and some machine guns and allowed the force to control sections of land around Jewish villages and Kibbutzim. The JSP also provided paramilitary training to Haganah units. The force thus expanded the assets of the Haganah and helped to provide a legal basis for much of their activities.

One notable member of the force was Ariel Sharon who joined the JSP in 1945 and became an instructor. Another notable member was Yigal Allon. Both later served as Ministers in the Israeli government, Sharon also as Prime Minister; Allon was interim Prime Minister.

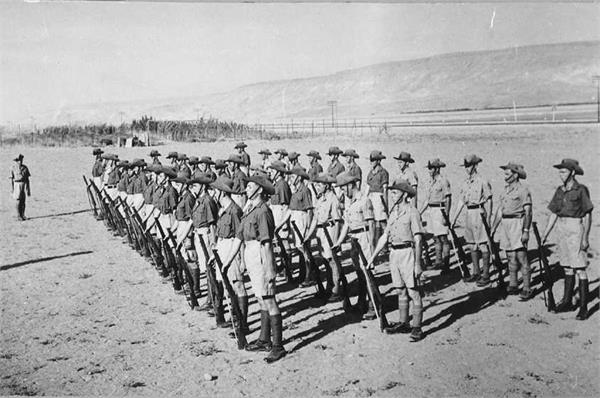
Jewish Settlement Police 1941

== See also ==
- Jewish Supernumerary Police

== Bibliography ==
- Bar-On, Mordechai (2004). A Never-Ending Conflict: A Guide to Israeli Military History. Praeger/Greenwood. ISBN 0-275-98158-4
- Black, Ian (1992). Israel's Secret Wars: A History of Israel's Intelligence Services. Grove Press. ISBN 0-8021-3286-3
- Federal Research Division (2004). Israel: A Country Study. Kessinger Publishing. ISBN 1-4191-2689-X
- Gal, Reuven (1986). Portrait of the Israeli Soldier. Praeger/Greenwood. ISBN 0-313-24315-8
- Karsh, Efraim (2002). The Arab-Israeli Conflict: The Palestine War 1948. Osprey Publishing. ISBN 1-84176-372-1
- Katz, Sam (1988). Israeli Units Since 1948. Osprey Publishing. ISBN 0-85045-837-4
- Kessler, David (1996). The Falashas: A Short History of the Ethiopian Jews. London: Routledge ISBN 0-7146-4646-6
- Khalaf, Issa (1991). Politics in Palestine: Arab Factionalism and Social Disintegration, 1939-1948. SUNY Press. ISBN 0-7914-0707-1
- Levenberg, Haim (1993). Military Preparations of the Arab Community in Palestine, 1945-1948. London: Routledge. ISBN 0-7146-3439-5
- Penkower, Monty Noam (1994). The Holocaust and Israel Reborn: From Catastrophe to Sovereignty. University of Illinois Press. ISBN 0-252-06378-3
- Report by Anglo-American Committee of Inquiry from 1946. Available online in the Jewish Virtual Library.
- Rosenzweig, Rafael N. (1989). The Economic Consequences of Zionism. Brill Academic Publishers. ISBN 90-04-09147-5
- Tal, David (2004). War and Palestine, 1948: Strategy and Diplomacy. London: Routledge. ISBN 0-7146-5275-X
- Tucker, Spencer C. (2001). Who's Who in Twentieth Century Warfare. London: Routledge. ISBN 0-415-23497-2
- Zweig, Ferdynand (1970). Israel: the Sword and the Harp. Fairleigh Dickinson University Press. ISBN 0-8386-7534-4
