= Special Night Squads =

Counter-insurgency unit in the British Mandate of Palestine

- פלוגות הלילה המיוחדות; Plugot Ha'Layla Ha'Meyukhadot
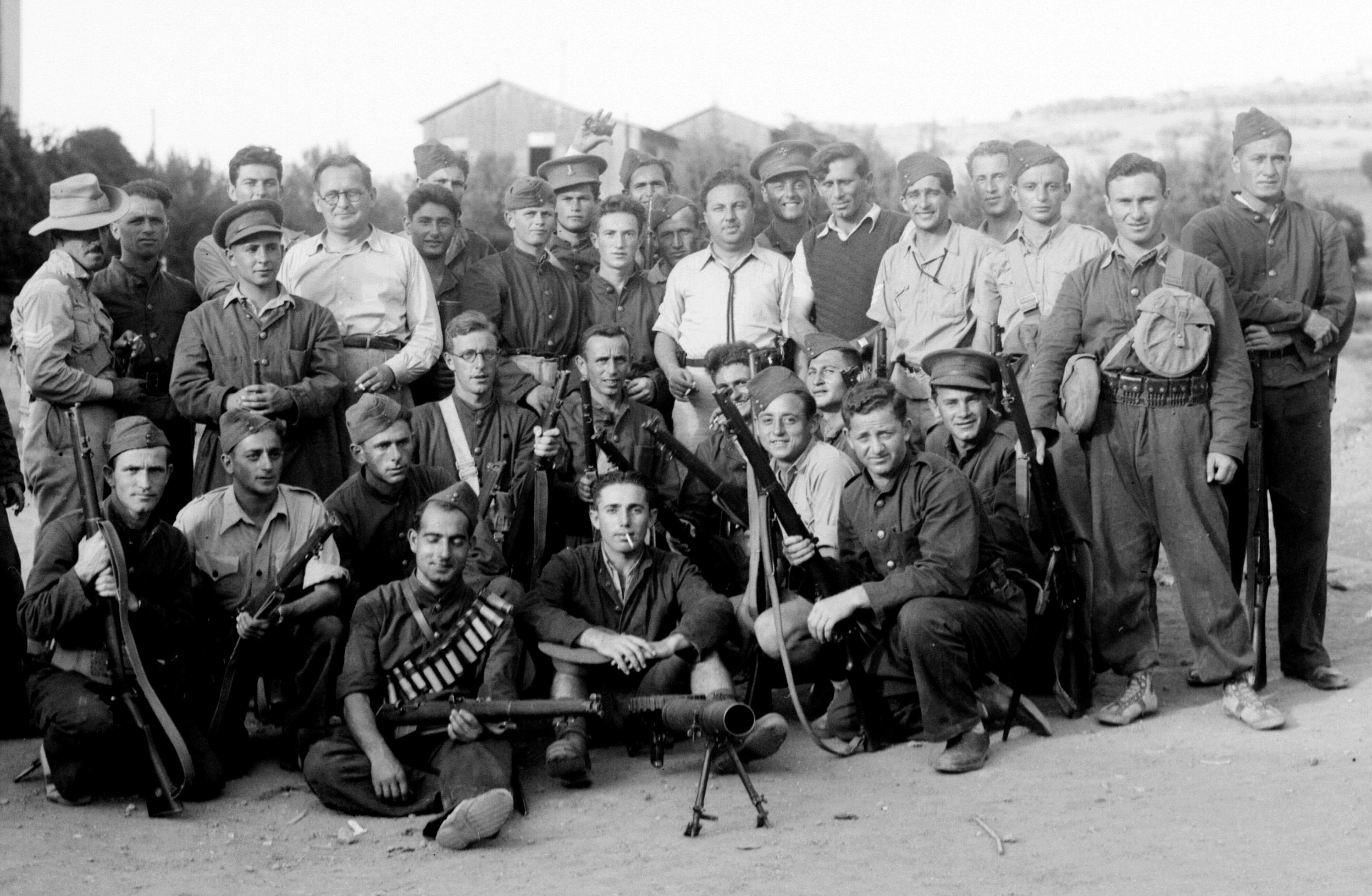
- Members of the Special Night Squads
- Active: 1938–1939
- Disbanded: 1939
- Country: British Mandate of Palestine
- Branch: British Army
- Type: Counter-insurgency
- Role: Special operations
- Size: 100 (1938)
- Part of: British Army
- Garrison/HQ: Northern Palestine
- Nickname: SNS
- Engagements: 1936–1939 Arab revolt in Palestine
- Decorations: Distinguished Service Order (DSO), Military Cross (MC)

Commanders
- Notable commanders: Captain Orde Wingate

The Special Night Squads (Note: Hebrew: פלוגות הלילה המיוחדות, Plugot Ha'Layla Ha'Meyukhadot) (SNS) was a joint British–Jewish counter-insurgency military unit, established by Captain Orde Wingate in Mandatory Palestine in 1938 during the 1936–1939 Arab revolt. The SNS consisted of British infantry soldiers, together with some men drawn from the Jewish Supernumerary Police. Total unit strength was 100 by 1938.

Wingate selected his men personally, among them Yigal Allon and Moshe Dayan, and trained them to form small mobile striking units. Wingate also collaborated with the Jewish paramilitary formation, the Haganah, reinforcing his unit with some of Haganah's Fosh commandos.

== Creation and deployment ==
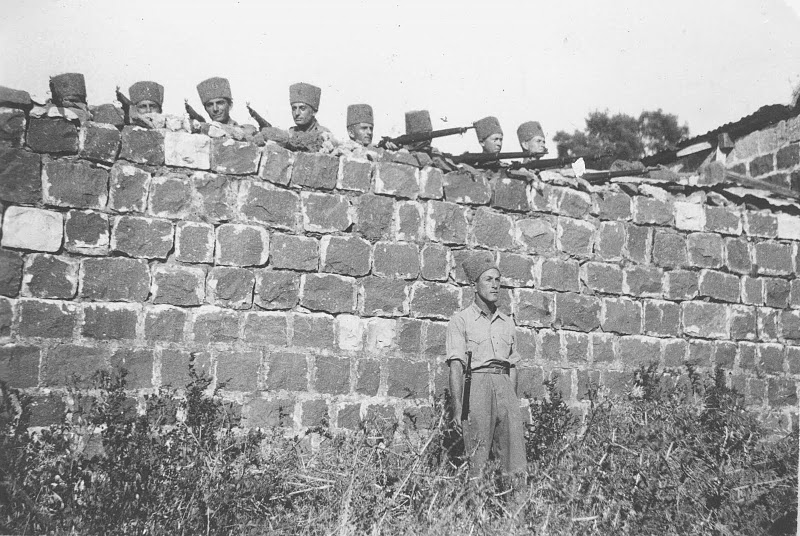
Members of the Special Night Squads, possibly in Kfar Tavor.

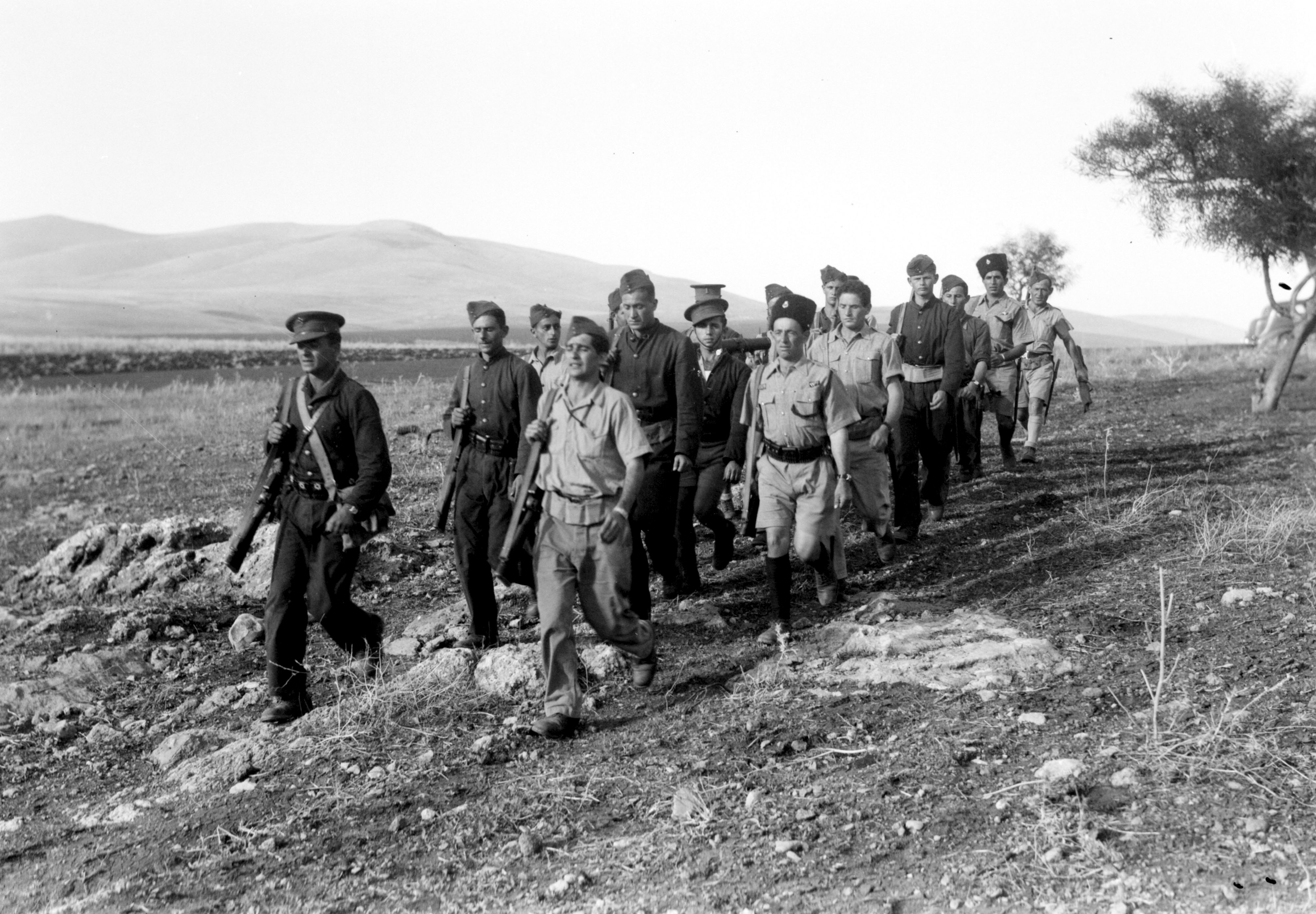
Members of the Special Night Squads going out to train in the Jezreel Valley, december 1938.

Historian Simon Anglim noted that the Special Night Squads were preceded by similar units, such as the "Corps of Gurkha Scouts", organized for carrying out night-time ambushes in the North-West Frontier Province of British India 1919, and by the paramilitary Auxiliary Division of the Royal Irish Constabulary which conducted counter-insurgency operations during the Irish War of Independence.

Orde Wingate, an intelligence officer of the British Army's General Headquarters (GHQ) in Jerusalem, examined sabotage and weapon smuggling operations in northern Palestine (Galilee). During March 1938, after several weeks of experimental ambushes and patrols, he had gained permission from the General Officer Commanding (GOC) in Palestine, Lieutenant-General Archibald Wavell, to establish a joint British-Jewish unit for night operations against the Arab insurgents. However, the Jewish Agency had opposed this venture at first, resulting in its postponement until early June.

The new GOC in Palestine, Lieutenant-General Robert Haining, had also approved Wingate's proposal to establish a "Night Movement Group", and the SNS became operative on early June, 1938. The military historian Hew Strachan has described the tactics Wingate employed as a form of state terrorism, and its mode of operation eventually led to allegations that Wingate had effectively organized these nights squads into Jewish 'murder gangs' or 'death squads'. According to Israeli military historian Martin van Creveld, their training included "how to kill without compunction, how to interrogate prisoners by shooting every tenth man to make the rest talk; and how to deter future terrorists by pushing the heads of captured ones into pools of oil and then freeing them to tell the story."

The 16th Infantry Brigade, under Brigadier John Fullerton Evetts, supplied three twelve-man squads, including officers, to the new unit. The men were taken from the Royal Ulster Rifles (squad commanded by Lieutenant Bala Bredin), the Royal West Kent Regiment (squad commanded by Lt. Michael "Mike" Grove) and the Manchester Regiment (squad commanded by commanded by Lt. Robert "Rex" King-Clark).

Twenty-five Jews were assigned to the unit as supernumerary policemen, all of them Haganah members. The Jews were selected by Haganah regional commanders and by Yitzhak Sadeh, commander of the FOSH units in the Haganah. Later, 50 more Jews were assigned to the SNS, also from Haganah cadres. The success of the SNS caused the establishment of a fourth SNS-like unit in the Plain of Sharon, tasked with guarding the electric power line. During 1939, every British brigade in Palestine established their own Special Night Squads, although without Jewish participation.

Wingate left the SNS in October 1938, for a leave in England. During his leave he was involved with the Zionist opposition to the Woodhead Commission report, meeting with such notables as Malcolm MacDonald, then secretary of the colonies, Beaverbrook and Churchill. This was frowned upon by Wingate's commanders, who dismissed him from command of the SNS and returned him to GHQ intelligence during November 1938. Bredin replaced Wingate as commander of the SNS, until it was disbanded.

The SNS continued to operate in the original form until January 1939 when, due to British policy change, the Jewish supernumeraries were forbidden from participating in offensive operations. Thereafter, the Jewish SNS served mainly on prison guard and garrison duties. They were disbanded during September 1939.

The British government eventually considered Wingate to be a security risk. He was posted out of Palestine and his passport was stamped "NOT ALLOWED TO ENTER PALESTINE". The Special Night Squads came to be considered one of the first special forces units constituted by the British and have been seen by some historians as being a forerunner of the Special Air Service (SAS). (Note: Brown and Louis, 1999, p. 293 "The British army’s first special forces, they represented the forerunners of the later Special Air Service Regiments.")

== Operational activities ==
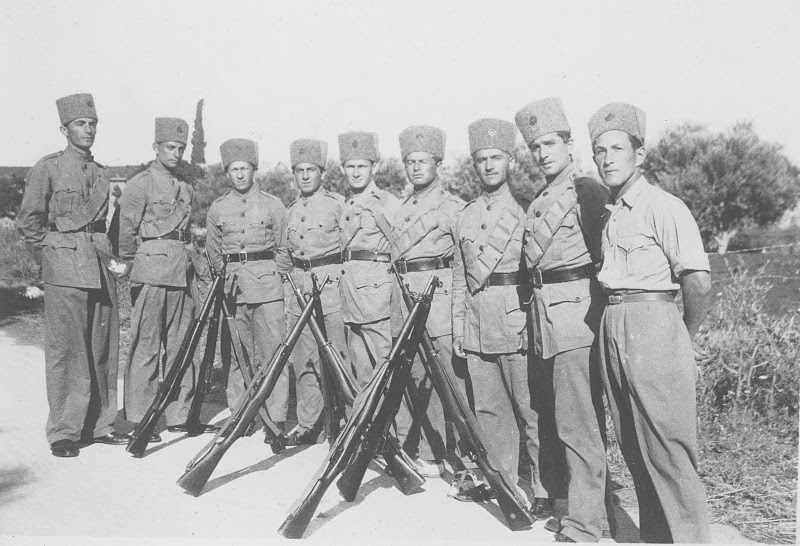
Members of the Special Night Squads

The Special Night Squads' primary task was to defend the Iraq Petroleum Company pipeline, which was frequently attacked by Arab insurgents. The squads also raided known insurgent bases, such as the villages of Daburiyya and Khirbat Lid. The force's success caused the cessation of attacks on the pipeline and brought a decrease of insurgent activity in the area. It is presumed that about 12.5% of all guerrilla casualties during 1938 were caused by the SNS, which had lost only two of its men (Pvt. Stephen Chapman from the Royal West Kents and supernumerary Yosef Ben-Moshe) in action. For the unit's actions in Palestine, Wingate was awarded the Distinguished Service Order (DSO), and three SNS officers were awarded the Military Cross (MC). Several soldiers and supernumeraries were also awarded medals and citations.

== Criticism ==
The SNS faced heavy criticism over the tactics it used to suppress Arab revolts with collective punishment, torture, and indiscriminate firings being common points of controversy. The SNS instilled fear into villages by threatening the decimation of villages in proportions(e.g every eighth male villager executed) if demands such as seizure of weapons weren't met. Torture tactics involved beatings with biographies of Wingate further detailing the forcing of sand into villagers' mouths until they vomited.

Israeli historian Yoram Kaniuk writes:

The operations came more frequently and became more ruthless. The Arabs complained to the British about Wingate's brutality and harsh punitive methods. Even members of the field squads complained... that during the raids on Bedouin encampments Wingate would behave with extreme viciousness and fire mercilessly. Wingate believed in the principle of surprise in punishment, which was designed to confine the gangs to their villages. More than once he had lined rioters up in a row and shot them in cold blood. Wingate did not try to justify himself; weapons and war cannot be pure.

Field Marshal Bernard Montgomery, 1st Viscount Montgomery of Alamein, who as commander of Northern Palestine had authorized the SNS, told Moshe Dayan in 1966 that he considered Wingate to have "been mentally unbalanced and that the best thing he ever did was to get killed in a plane crash in 1944".
