= Kfar Ruppin =

Kibbutz in northern Israel

Kfar Ruppin: כפר רופין (Hebrew)
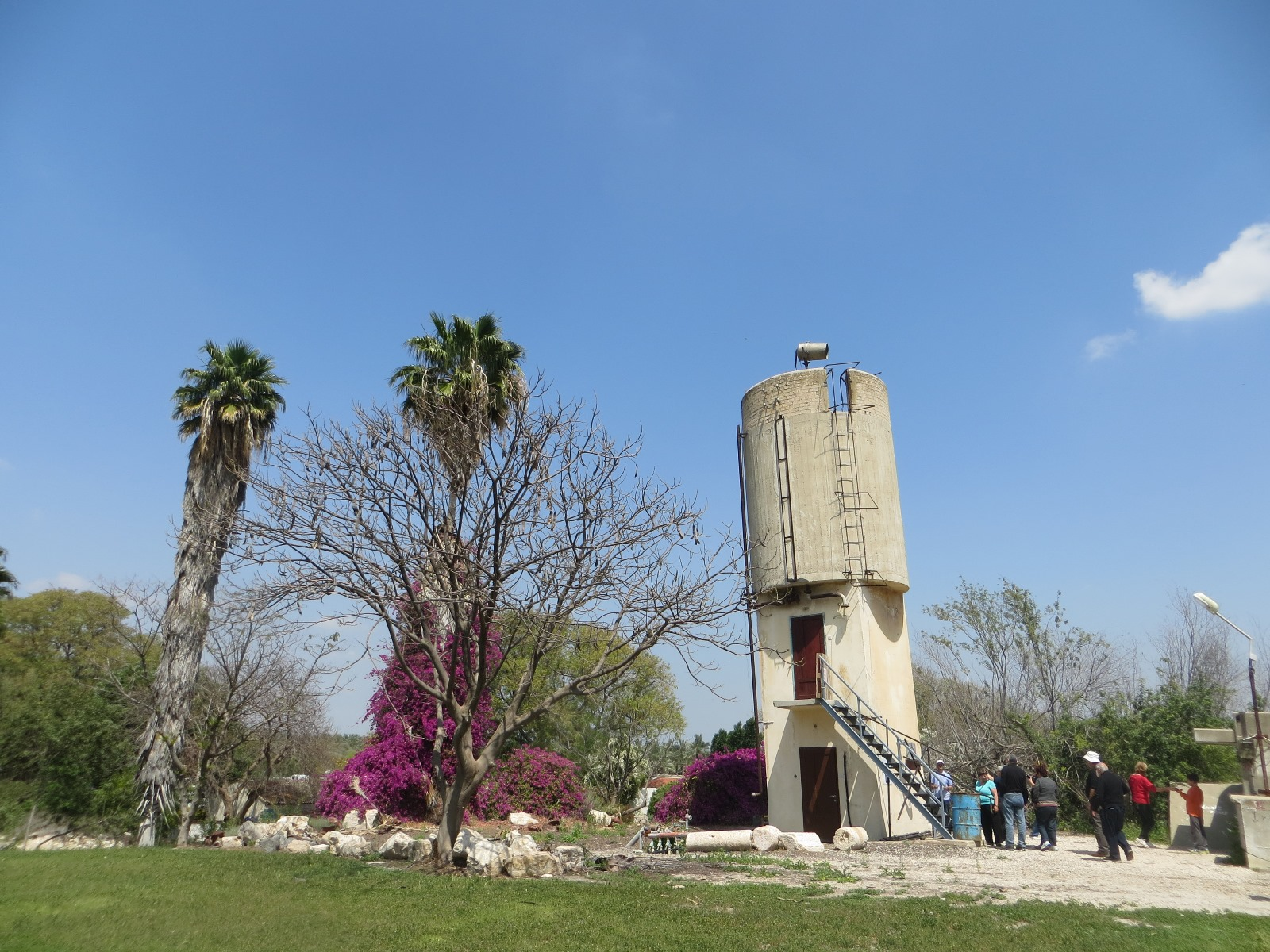
- Etymology: Ruppin Village
- Location within Jezreel Valley region of Israel Location within Israel
- Coordinates: 32°27′27″N 35°33′22″E
- Country: Israel
- District: Northern
- Subdistrict: Jezreel
- Council: Valley of Springs
- Affiliation: Kibbutz Movement
- Founded: 1938
- Founder: Massad members
- Population (2024): 620
- Website: www.kfar-ruppin.org.il

Kfar Ruppin (Hebrew: כפר רופין, lit. 'Kfar Ruppin') is a kibbutz in the Beit She'an Valley, about 5 km (3.1 mi) southeast of Beit She'an in northern Israel. A member of the Kibbutz Movement, it falls under the jurisdiction of Valley of Springs Regional Council. In 2024 it had a population of 620.

== History ==
The kibbutz was founded in 1938 by the "Massad" group as part of the Tower and Stockade enterprise. The first residents were members of the Noar Haoved youth movement immigrants from Nazi Germany, German-speaking Bohemia in Czechoslovakia, and the Federal State of Austria, and former members of a labour group from Herzliya. It was named in honour of Arthur Ruppin, a Zionist leader who was at the time the head of the Settlement Department of the Jewish Agency and who helped the group with establishing the kibbutz as part of his effort to develop Jewish settlement in the Land of Israel. The small group of settlers was facing very harsh living conditions, which led their parent movement to direct some 80 members of the "BeNativ" group to join them in 1942. Most of these had arrived from Czechoslovakia via illegal immigrant ships in the Fifth Aliyah.

Kfar Ruppin is located near the depopulated Palestinian village of Masil al-Jizl.

Since 2017, the Mekhinat HaEmek (מכינת העמ״ק) pre-army preparatory academy has been located in the kibbutz, rather than the nearby moshav Tel Te'omim. The mechina was established in 2006 and admits both religious and secular men and women. It is now in its twelfth session; learn and volunteer on the kibbutz and the surrounding area.

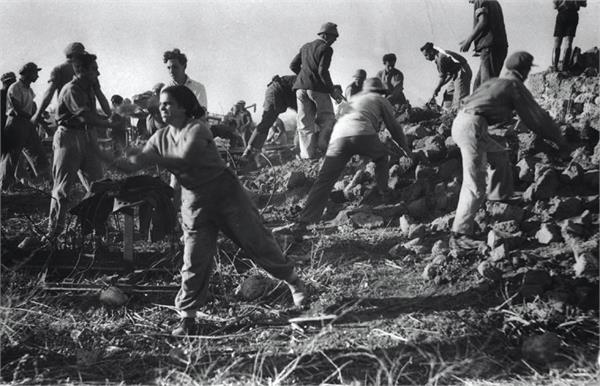
Kfar Ruppin under construction 1938

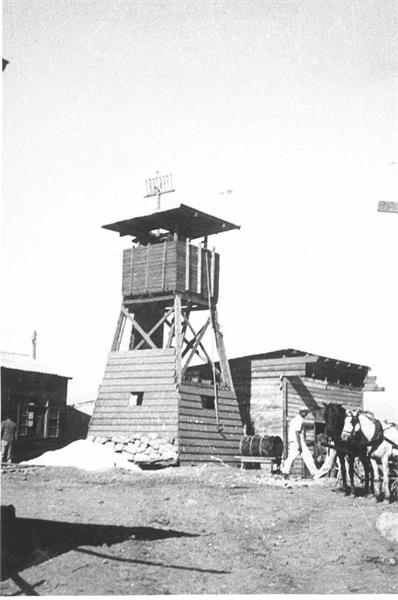
Kfar Ruppin tower 1938

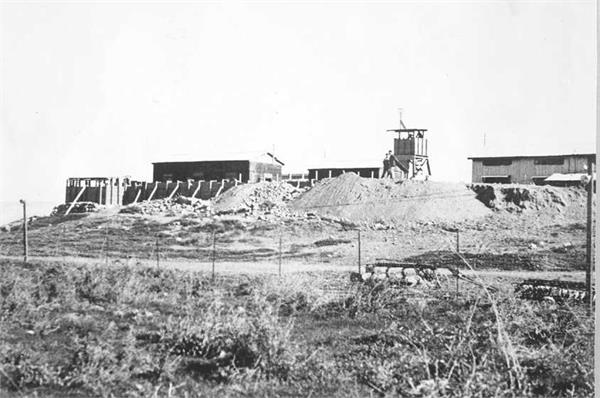
Kfar Ruppin stockade under construction 1938

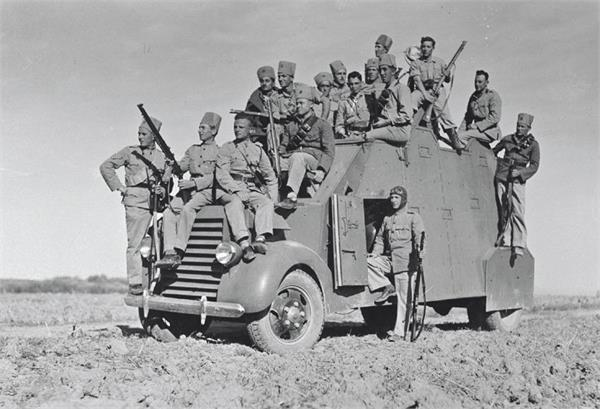
Kfar Ruppin Settlement Police 1938

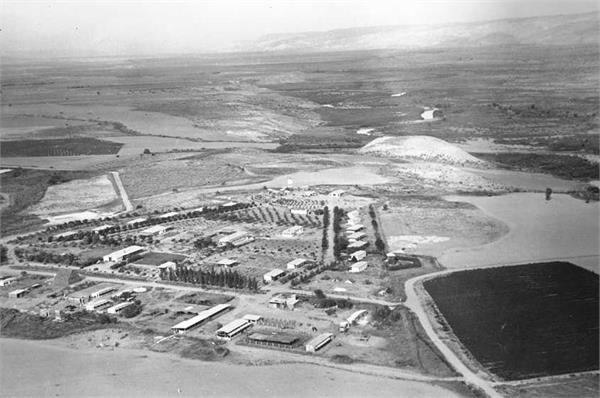
Kfar Ruppin 1946

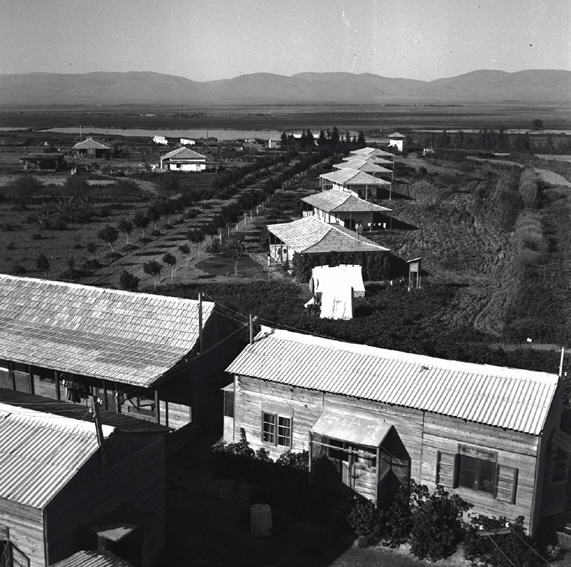
Kfar Ruppin 1946

== Economy ==
As of 2016, Kfar Ruppin's economy was fully privatised.

In 2016, the largest part of the kibbutz revenue came from the privately managed "Palkar" factory, established in 1978 for the production of plastic goods and already managed by an external company in 2000.

Kfar Ruppin still has strong agricultural activities, with fish farming including ornamental fish breeding, dairy and chicken farms, date and red grapefruit plantations, and wheat and maize crops.

== Birdwatching ==
The area is known for birdwatching due to its location on one of the most important bird migration flyways between Europe and Africa. A bird ringing station is also located there. The kibbutz culture hall, built in 1965 on a hill near the original tower and stockade structures, is being converted into a birdwatching observatory and research center.

== Landmarks ==
Kfar Ruppin has a 50 acres (200,000 m^{2}) public garden on the grounds of the kibbutz.

Near the kibbutz is an archaeological site called Tel Tsaf, a 7,000-year-old prehistoric village which has produced the largest database of materials from the Neolithic to the Chalcolithic periods.

== Notable people ==
- Efrat Natan

== See also ==
- Wildlife in Israel
- Tourism in Israel
