= Masil al-Jizl =

Masil al-Jizl مسيل الجزل/عرب الزيناتي Arab al-Zinati
- Village
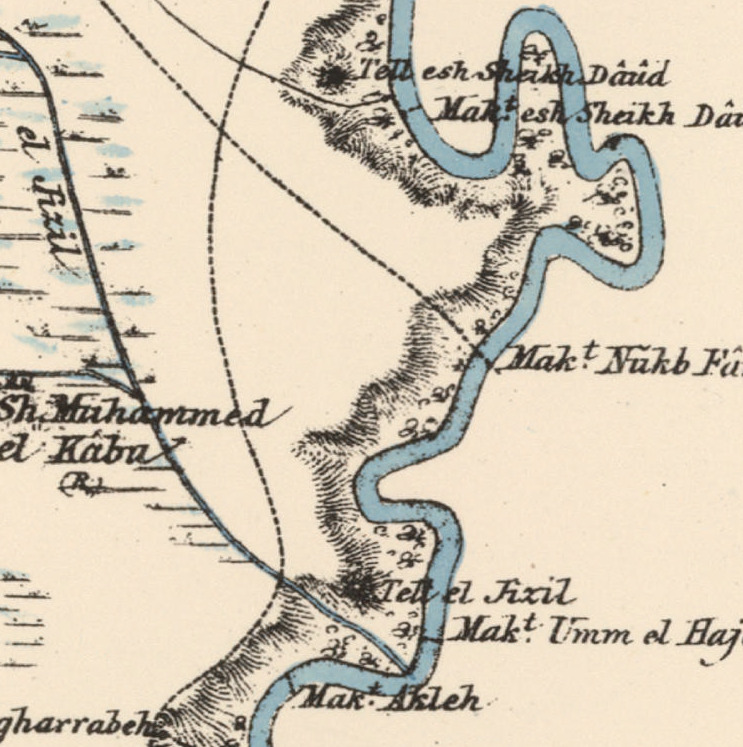
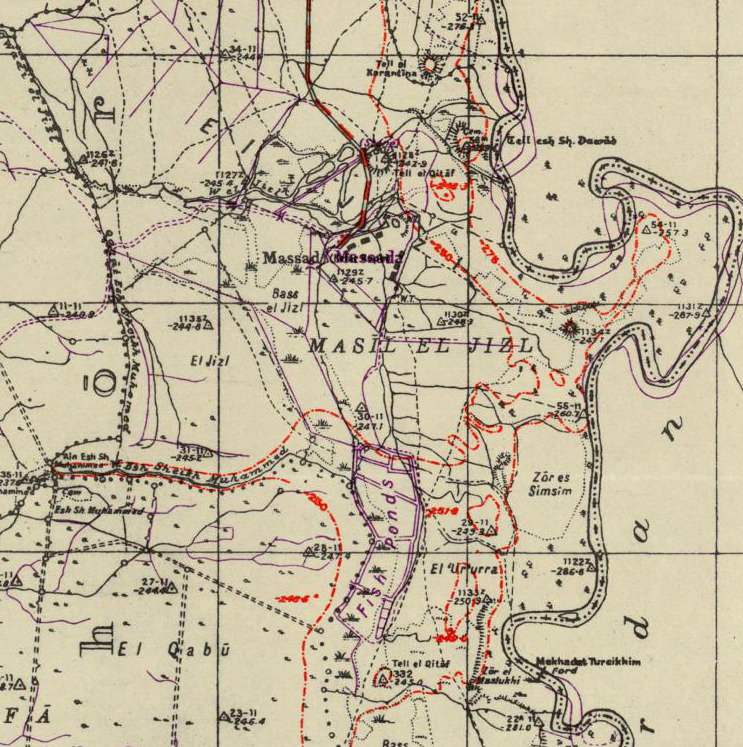
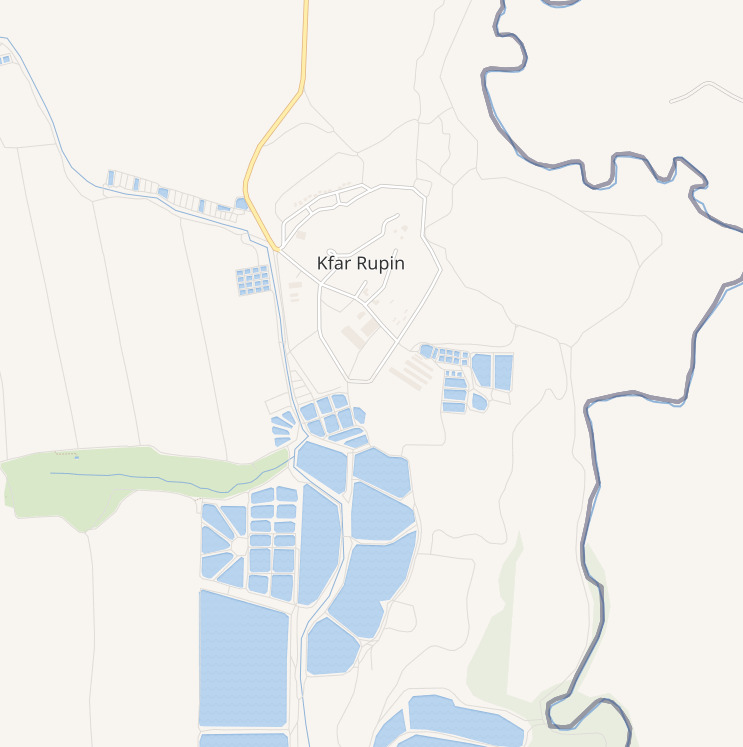
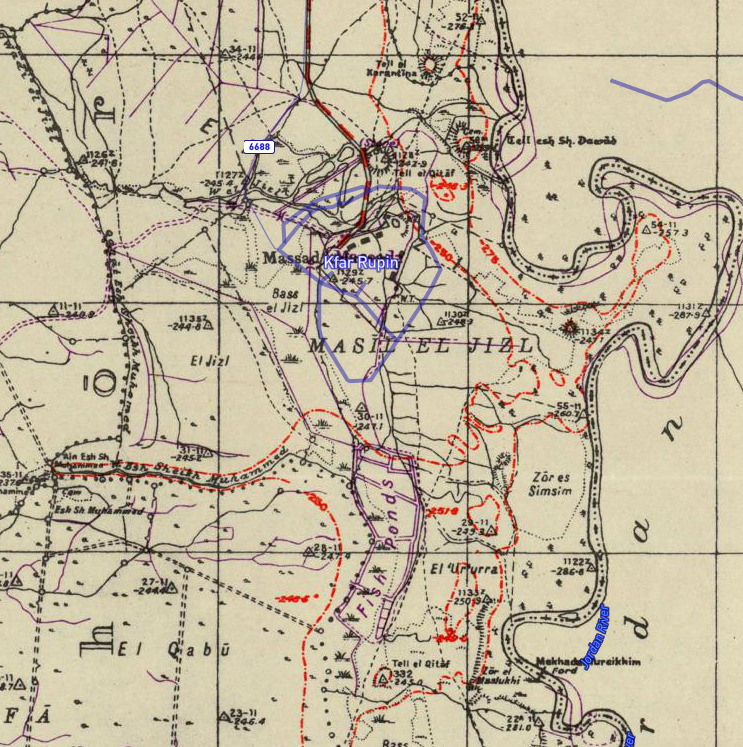
- 1870s map 1940s map modern map 1940s with modern overlay map A series of historical maps of the area around Masil al-Jizl (click the buttons)

- Location within Mandatory Palestine
- Coordinates: 32°27′15″N 35°33′26″E
- Palestine grid: 202/207
- Geopolitical entity: Mandatory Palestine
- Subdistrict: Baysan
- Date of depopulation: May 31, 1948

Area
  - Total: 976 dunams (97.6 ha; 241 acres)

Population (1945)
  - Total: 100
- Current Localities: Kfar Ruppin

Masil al-Jizl was a Palestinian Arab village in the District of Baysan. It was depopulated by the Israel Defense Forces during the Arab-Israeli War. It was attacked and depopulated on May 31, 1948, as part of Operation Gideon.

== History ==
There were several archeological sites in the vicinity, including Tall al-Qitaf, Kh. al-Hajj Mahmud and Tall al-Shaykh Dawud.

=== British Mandate era ===
In the 1922 census of Palestine, conducted by the Mandatory Palestine authorities, Mesil al-Jezel had a population of 64; all Muslims, increasing in the 1931 census to 197 Muslims, in a total of 47 houses.

In the 1945 statistics, the population was 100 Muslims, with a total of 976 dunams of land. Of this, 252 dunams were for plantations and irrigated land, 702 for cereals, while 22 dunams were non-cultivable land.

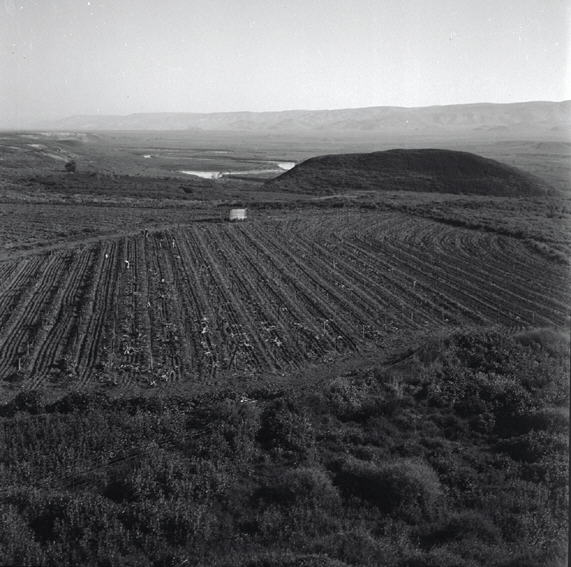
Masil al-Jizl view of tell 1946

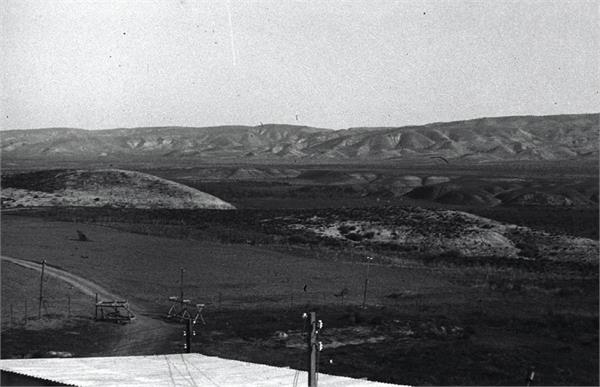
Masil al-Jizl view of tell 1938

Village land currently used by Kfar Ruppin.

== Bibliography ==
- Barron, J.B., ed. (1923). Palestine: Report and General Abstracts of the Census of 1922. Government of Palestine.
- Government of Palestine, Department of Statistics (1945). Village Statistics, April, 1945.
- Hadawi, S. (1970). Village Statistics of 1945: A Classification of Land and Area ownership in Palestine. Palestine Liberation Organization Research Center.
- Khalidi, W. (1992). All That Remains:The Palestinian Villages Occupied and Depopulated by Israel in 1948. Washington D.C.: Institute for Palestine Studies. ISBN 0-88728-224-5.
- Mills, E., ed. (1932). Census of Palestine 1931. Population of Villages, Towns and Administrative Areas. Jerusalem: Government of Palestine.
- Morris, B. (2004). The Birth of the Palestinian Refugee Problem Revisited. Cambridge University Press. ISBN 978-0-521-00967-6.
