= Dirar ibn al-Khattab =

Warrior in the early Islamic conquests

Dhiraar ibn al-Khattab
- Born: Mecca
- Relatives: Banu Fihr branch of Quraysh (clan); Adnanite (tribe)
- Military career
- Allegiance: Rashidun Caliphate.
- Branch: Rashidun army
- Service years: ? - 639 (disputed)
- Units: Rashidun army Rashidun cavalry
- Conflicts: Battle of Uhud; Battle of the trench Ridda wars Muslim conquest of Syria; Muslim conquest of Persia

Dhiraar ibn al-Khattab (Arabic: ضرار بن الخطاب) was a warrior participating in the early Islamic conquests. Dhiraar's father, al-Khattab bin Mirdas bin Kathir, was the head of the Banu Fihr clan of Quraish subclan are found throughout his works. Khattab bin Mirdas has lineage through their grandfather, Fihr ibn Malik, with the Prophet. His mother was Hind bint Malik Umm Dhiraar bint Amr, and His uncle was Hafs bin Mirdas.

== Biography ==
Dhiraar bin al-Khattab was born in Mecca. As his father was a respected head of the Banu Fihr clan, Dhiraar was trained as a brave warrior and known as a skilled poet. Ibn 'Abd al-Barr said he was also well known for his skill in Equestrianism.

Dhiraar participated during the Battle of Uhud, where he served under Khalid ibn Walid riders, ambushing the Muslim archers on the Mount of Uhud. He recorded, in his own words, that he successfully killed 11 Muslims. Some of those who he had killed were Ansar fighters: Amr bin Muadh al-Nu'man, 'Amr bin Thabit bin Waqqas, Sayf bin Qayz, Iyas bin Aws bin Atik.

During the Battle of Khandaq, when the Qurayshites under Abu Sufyan ibn Harb led the campaign against Muslims in Medina, Dhiraar was one of the small band of riders of the allied army that was able to jump over the trenches, along with Amr ibn Abd al-Wud, Ikrimah ibn Abi Jahl, Nawfal ibn Abdullah Ibn Mughirah al-Makhzumi and Hubayrah bin Abi Wahb al-Makhzumi, which prompted two Muslim warriors, Zubayr ibn al-Awwam and Umar ibn al-Khattab, to chase those horsemen and fight them. Zubayr managed to slay Ibn Mughirah and force Ikrima to flee from the battlefield, while Amr ibn Abd al-Wud was slain by Ali ibn Abi Talib in a duel. On the other hand, Dhiraar managed to overcome Umar. However, Dhiraar decided to spare Umar's life as he said he did not want to kill a fellow Quraishite kinsman in this battle.

Dhirrar became Muslim on the day of the conquest of Mecca.

Dhiraar fought in the Ridda wars when the Caliphate under Abu Bakr was hit by rebellions across Arab, where Dhiraar participated in the Battle of Yamama under Khalid ibn al-Walid.

During Khalid ibn al-Walid's campaign in the Muslim conquest of Iraq, he formed Ummal, a military unit that acted as his deputy personnel to govern, watch, and collect Kharaj and Jizya in the occupied areas, or as raiding parties in uncaptured cities or settlements. At one time, Khalid appointed Dhiraar ibn al-Azwar, Al-Qa'qa' ibn Amr al-Tamimi, Dhiraar ibn al-Khattab, al-Muthanna ibn Haritha, Dhiraar ibn Muqrin, and Busr ibn Abi Ruhm as Ummal raiding force to raid Sib, a district located near the city of Qasr ibn Hubayrah and north of Hillah. These raiding detachment forces made repeated, casual raids until it was subdued.

Later, during Muslim conquest of the Levant, Dhiraar fought in the Battle of Yarmouk under Abu Ubayda ibn al-Jarrah.

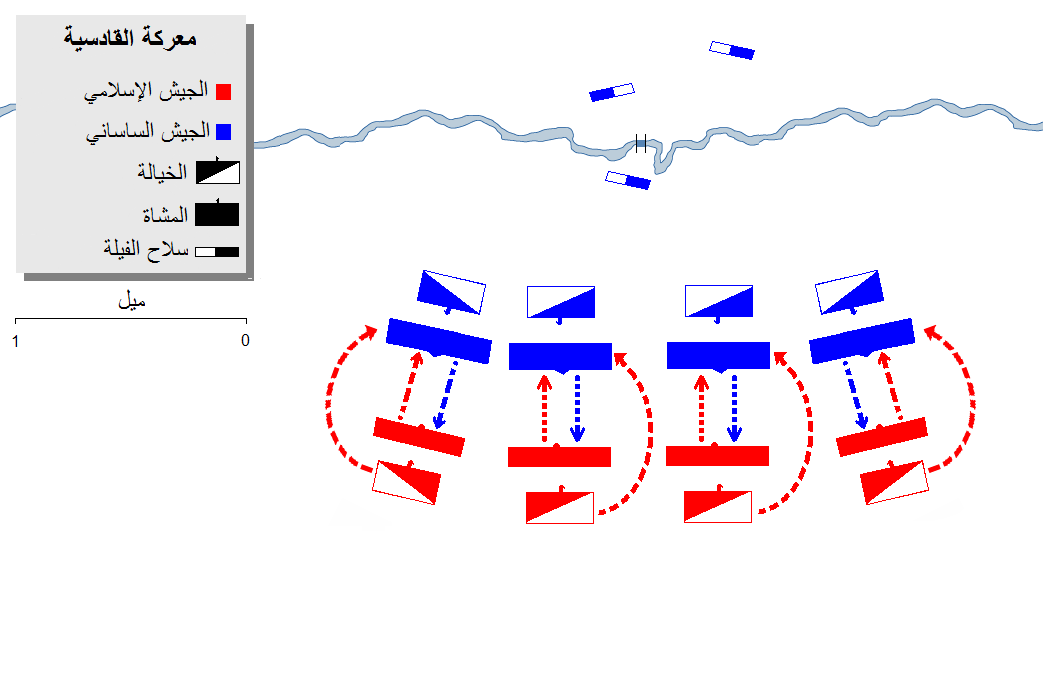
Elephant corps of Sassanid permanently annihilated after Amr ibn Ma'adi Yakrib fought hard until beyond the bridge

Dhiraar fought in the Battle of Qadisiyyah under Sa'd ibn Abi Waqqas. On the third day of the battle which was called the day of Imash when the Sassanid elephant corps going rampage towards the Rashidun ranks, the Rashidun top commanders brought themselves to personally engage the elephants. Amr ibn Ma'adi Yakrib were the one who instructed the Rashidun soldiers to sever the trunks of the elephants, which done so by the soldiers around him and stopped their advance. Historical narratives from poets recited during this battle revealed that Amr was the first to realize the elephants of Sassanid armies had paralyzed the horses of Rashidun, as the mounts were not used to being close to such animals. Then Dhiraar ibn al-Khattab charged along with Khalid ibn Urfuta, Jarir ibn Abdullah Al-Bajali, Al-Qa'qa' ibn Amr al-Tamimi, Tulayha, Amr ibn Ma'adi Yakrib and Dhiraar ibn al-Azwar to turn and engage against the elephant corps, aiming their weapons to pierced the elephants eyes, while also aimed to kill the elephant riders.

Later, Dhiraar fought in the Battle of Jalula under Hashim ibn Utba.

Later, as Sa'd heard Hormuzan once again gathered a group of Persian forces on the plain of Masabzan, he immediately informed caliph Umar, who in turn sent an army led by Dhiraar ibn al-Khattab, Al-Hudhayl Al-Asadi, and Abd Allah ibn Wahb al-Rasibi. This force immediately engaged Hormuzan and successfully defeat the Persian in Masabzan, while capturing one of the Persian commander. Sa'd in turn then placing Dhiraar as administrator in Masabzan area.

After the Battle of Nahavand caliph Umar sent Dhiraar to defeat Sassanid army in an area called Masabdhan.

== Quotes ==
Sometime after Dhiraar embraced Islam, he met some people from Aus and Khazraj arguing over who of the two tribes was the bravest during the battle of Uhud. Aus and Khazraj are two Ansar tribes. When they saw Dhirar crossing, they asked him. Dhirar, who had become a good Muslim, said:

"I don't know who among you are from the Aus or Khazraj Tribe, but what is clear, when that battle(Uhud) broke out, I managed to marry 11 of you to the maidens of heaven."

This means, Dhiraar who was still a polytheist at that battle time, had killed 11 Muslims. Since due to Islamic belief, if a Muslim goes to war and is killed by infidels, they certainly go straight to heaven without judgment.

== See also ==
- Battle of al-Qādisiyyah
- Battle of Yarmouk
- Dhiraar bin Al-Azwar
