= Rex King-Clark =

Robert "Rex" King-Clark MBE MC (27 November 1913 – 29 December 2007) was a British soldier, pilot, racer, photographer, author, and diarist.

== Life ==
Rex King-Clark was born on 27 November 1913, son of Alexander King-Clark and Katherine Margaret Elizabeth Mainwaring Knocker. He was educated at the Loretto School.

On the outbreak of the Second World War in September 1939, Rex King-Clark was 25 years old. For the previous five years, he had been serving as a subaltern officer in The Manchester Regiment commanding an infantry platoon in Yorkshire, Egypt, Palestine and Singapore. In 1934 an inheritance enabled him to channel his surplus energy and enthusiasms into other fields as well. He flew his Miles Whitney Straight aircraft as far as Egypt, Singapore, and Bali. During March 1937, he flew aerial reconnaissance flights over the harbor at Benghazi, North Africa, taking photographs which were later used by the Royal Air Force during the Second World War. He toured Europe and America by car and raced his MG J4 at Brooklands which qualified him to become a member of the prestigious British Racing Drivers' Club.

In 1938 during the 'Troubles' in Palestine, he commanded one of Orde Wingate's three Special Night Squads, the SNS of Israeli folklore, for the leadership of which he was awarded the Military Cross. His diaries of his pre-war adventures formed the basis for Free For a Blast published in 1988.

During the Second World War, he fought in the Battle of France, and was evacuated from Dunkirk. He commanded 2nd Battalion The Manchester Regiment during the Battle of Kohima fought on the Burma/India border from April to June 1944, despite being wounded on 24 April. King-Clark was promoted captain in 1942 and major in 1947 (although he was already acting in that rank). He wrote two books from his diaries of those times, The Battle for Kohima, and Forward From Kohima.

He married Jean May Evelyn Campbell, on 16 January 1950. They had two children, Robert Campbell King-Clark (born 28 October 1950), and Catherine Mainwaring King-Clark (born 30 October 1952). He retired from the Manchester Regiment with the rank of lieutenant colonel in 1958.

King-Clark was one of the last two surviving drivers who raced at Brooklands before the Second World War, and was the oldest surviving member of the British Racing Drivers' Club. He continued to be involved in the reconstruction of classic racing cars until late in his life.

== Bibliography ==
- Free for a Blast, ISBN 978-0-903243-07-0. The author's experiences racing and soldiering with the Manchester Regiment from 1934 to 1939. Grenville Publishing Company Limited, England, (31 December 1988).
- The Battle for Kohima 19440: The Narrative of the 2nd Battalion the Manchester Regiment - The Machine Gun Battalion of the British 2nd Division ISBN 978-1-873907-01-6. Fleur de Lys Publishers (October 1995)
- Forward From Kohima - A Burma Diary November 1944 to May 1945 ISBN 978-1-873907-11-5. Fleur de Lys Publishers (2003).
- Jack Churchill: Unlimited Boldness, ISBN 978-1-873907-06-1, an account of the fantastic career of 'Mad Jack' Churchill, who fought World War II with a sword, and bow and arrows. Fleur-de-Lys Publishers (January 1997).
