= Khawla bint al-Azwar =

Legendary female Muslim Arab warrior

Khawla bint al-Azwar خولة بنت الازور
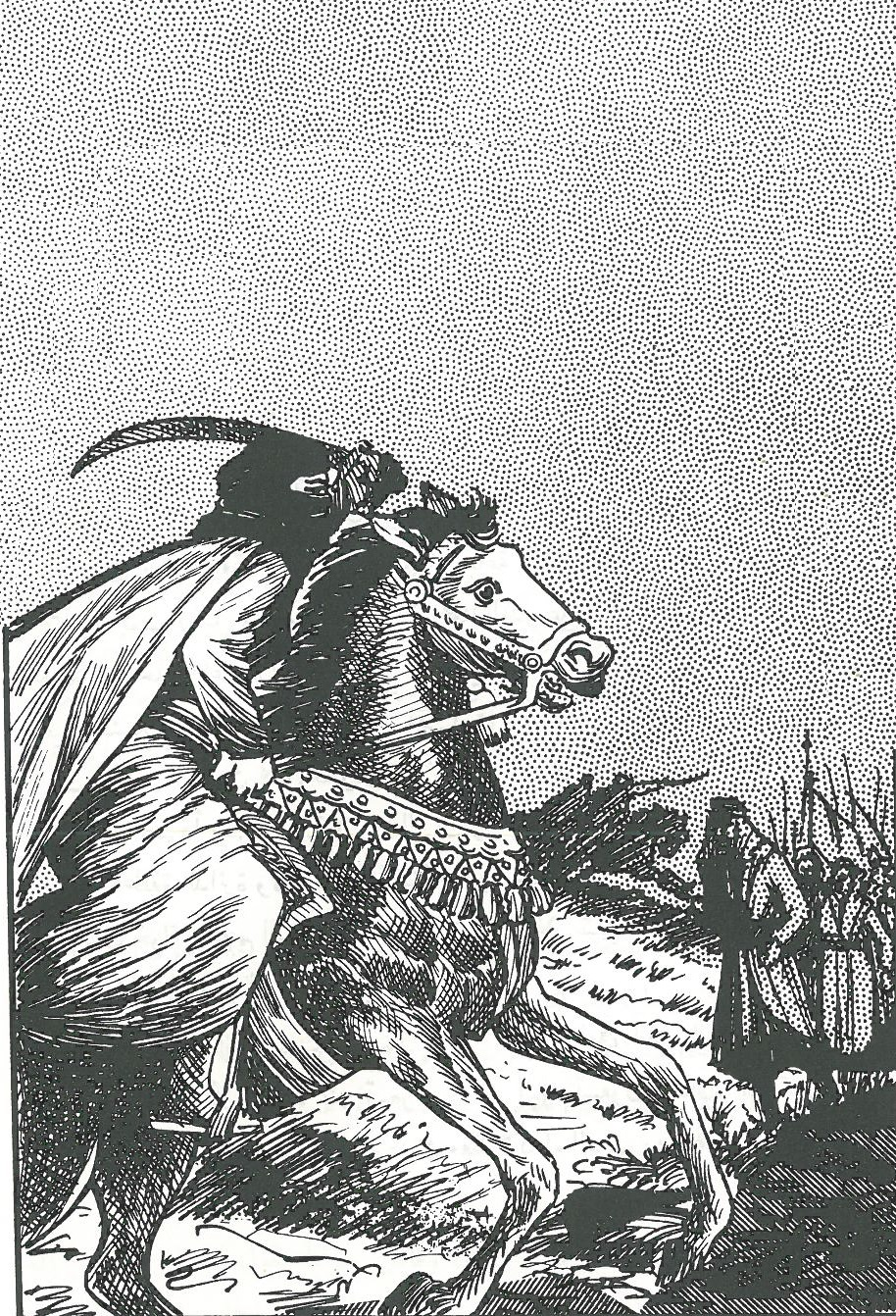
- Khawla bint al-Azwar riding into battle, as portrayed in Tārīkhunā bi-uslūb qaṣaṣī (Our History in a Narrative style), published 1935
- Born: Makkah, Saudi Arabia
- Died: 639; Bilad al-Sham
- Military career
- Allegiance: Rashidun Caliphate
- Branch: Rashidun army
- Service years: 629–636
- Conflicts: Battle of Sanita al-Uqab (634); Battle of Ajnadayn (634); Battle of Yarmuk (636)

Khawla bint al-Azwar (Arabic: خولة بنت الازور; died 639), was a Muslim warrior in the service of the Rashidun Caliphate. She played a major role in the Muslim conquest of the Levant, and fought alongside her brother Dhiraar. She has been described as one of the greatest female soldiers in history. She was a companion of the Islamic Prophet Muhammad.

Born sometime in the seventh century as the daughter of Azwar al Asadi, one of the chiefs of the Banu Assad tribe, Khawla was well known for her bravery in campaigns of the Muslim conquests in parts of the Levant. She fought side by side with her brother Dhiraar in many battles, including the decisive Battle of Yarmouk in 636 against the Byzantine Empire. On the fourth day of the battle she led a group of women against the Byzantine army and defeated its chief commander, and later was wounded during her fight with a Greek soldier.

== Military career ==
=== Origins and life ===
Khawla was likely born in the 7th-century and her father al-Azwar was a major chief of the Banu Asad tribe. Khawla's brother Dhiraar became a Muslim after the Battle of the Trench. Her family were also among the early converts to Islam. Dhiraar was a highly skilled warrior and taught Khawla everything he knew about fighting, including the spear, sword fighting, and martial arts.

=== Conquest of Syria ===
Her talent first appeared during the Battle of Sanita-al-Uqab in 634, fought during the Siege of Damascus, in which her brother Dhiraar was leading the Muslim forces, but was wounded and taken prisoner by the Byzantine army. Khalid ibn Walid took his mobile guard to rescue him. Khawla accompanied the army and rushed the Byzantine rearguard alone. In the armor and typical loose dress of Arabian warriors, she was not recognized as a woman until she was asked by Khalid about her identity.

In the Battle of Ajnadin, Khawla accompanied the Muslim forces to provide medical attention to wounded soldiers. After her brother Dhiraar was captured by the Byzantine forces, Khawla took a knight's armor, weapons, and mare, wrapping herself in a green shawl. She fought a Byzantine battalion, who were attacking Muslim soldiers. Khalid ibn Walid, the leader of the Muslim forces, ordered his soldiers to charge the Byzantines. Many of the Muslim soldiers thought that Khawla was Khalid until Khalid appeared. The Muslim army defeated the Byzantines, who fled the battlefield. Khalid ordered his army to chase the fleeing Byzantines. After a search, the Muslim prisoners were found and freed. One of the Rashidun army commanders, Shurahbil ibn Hassana, is reported to have said about her that:

This warrior fights like Khalid ibn Walid, but I am sure he is not Khalid.

During the Siege of Damascus, Khawla was taken as a war prisoner by the Byzantine forces. However, she managed to escape detainment.

=== Other campaigns ===
Some traditional sources claim that in another battle, Khawla was captured after falling from her donkey. After being taken to a camp with other women prisoners, Khawla was to be taken to the leader's tent as he intended to rape her. Instead, Khawla roused the other prisoners, who used the tent poles as weapons and attacked the Byzantine guards. According to Al-Waqidi, they managed to kill five Byzantine knights with Khawla taking credit for one, including the Byzantine who insulted her.

== Legacy ==
Khawla's fighting skills were praised by Umar. Many streets and schools in Saudi Arabia, are named after her. Jordan issued a stamp in her honor as part of the "Arab Women in History". Many Arab cities have schools and institutions carrying the name of Khawla bint al-Azwar. An Iraqi all-women military unit was named the "Khawla bint al-Azwar Unit" in Khawla's honor. In the United Arab Emirates, the first military college for women, Khawla bint Al Azwar Training College, is also named after her.

== Bibliography ==
- Kurzman, Charles (2002). Modernist Islam, 1840-1940: A Sourcebook. Oxford University Press. ISBN 9780195154689.
- Ezzati, A. (2002). The Spread of Islam: The Contributing Factors. ICAS Press. ISBN 9781904063018.

== Sources ==
- Islamic Thinkers
- Siddiqi
- Al Shindagah
- USA Today
- "Women in power 500-750" from Guide2womenleaders.com
