= Efrat Natan =

Israeli artist

Efrat Natan אפרת נתן
- Born: 1947 (age 78–79); Kfar Ruppin, Mandatory Palestine
- Education: Studied with Raffi Lavie
- Known for: Painting

Efrat Natan (Hebrew: אפרת נתן) is an Israeli artist.

== Biography ==
Efrat Natan was born and grew up on Kibbutz Kfar Ruppin in the Beit She'an Valley. She studied with Raffi Lavie. Her art was influenced by life on the kibbutz and utopian ideals. Her sculpture "Swing of the Scythe" (2002) is in the permanent exhibition of the Israel Museum. Composed of scythes arranged in a circle, the work draws on Natan's childhood memories growing up on a kibbutz as well as the myth of the Zionist pioneer, symbolizing the renewed relationship between the Jews and the land.

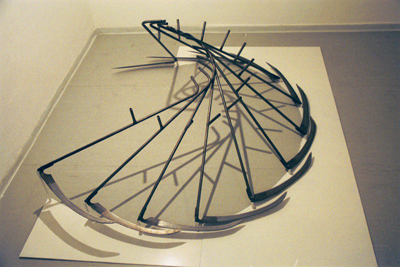
Swing of the Scythe Sculpture, 2002

== Awards and recognition ==
- 1979 Beatrice S. Kolliner Award for a Young Israeli Artist, Israel Museum, Jerusalem, Israel
- 2002 Prize to Encourage Creativity, Ministry of Science, Culture and Sport
- 2006 Ministry of Science, Culture and Sport Prize
- 2006 Ministry of Education Prize for the Fine Arts
- 2009: Mifal Hapayis Prize for the Fine Arts

== See also ==
- Visual arts in Israel
