= Jewish Supernumerary Police =

Auxiliary police force in Mandatory Palestine

- שוטרים מוספים
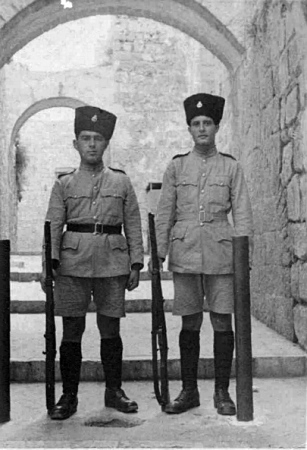
- Jewish Supernumerary Policemen, 1937
- Active: 1936–1948
- Disbanded: 1948
- Country: Mandatory Palestine
- Allegiance: Mandatory Palestine
- Branch: Notrim
- Type: Auxiliary police
- Role: Guard duties, counter-insurgency
- Size: 6,000–22,000
- Part of: British Army
- Garrison/HQ: Various Jewish settlements in Palestine
- Engagements: 1936–1939 Arab revolt in Palestine

The Jewish Supernumerary Police (Hebrew: שוטרים מוספים, romanized: Shotrim Musafim), sometimes referred to as Jewish Auxiliary Police, were a branch of the Notrim set up by the British in Mandatory Palestine in June 1936.

The British authorities gradually expanded the Supernumerary Police from 6,000 to 14,000 and ultimately 22,000. Those trained became the nucleus of the Haganah, which itself became the main constituent of the Israel Defense Forces during the 1948 Arab-Israeli War.

The other branch of the Notrim was an elite mobile force, created in 1938, known as the Jewish Settlement Police.

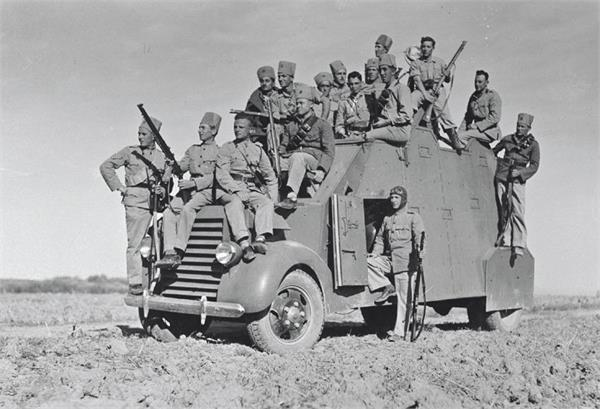
Jewish Supernumerary Police, Kfar Ruppin 1938

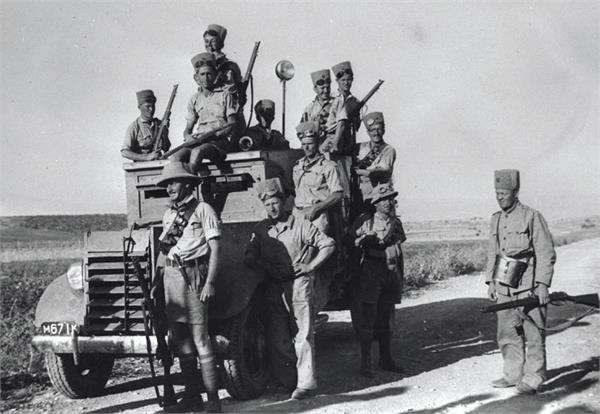
Jewish Supernumerary Police, 1938

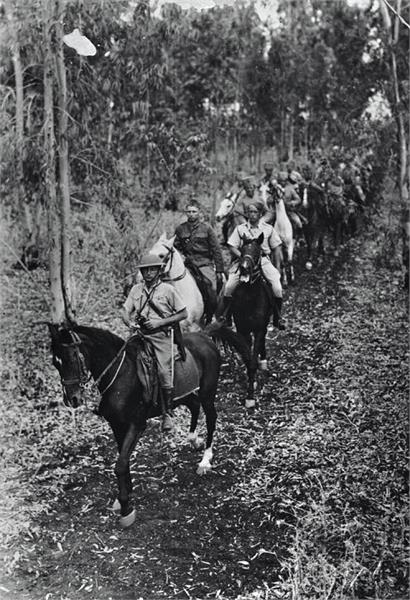
Jewish Supernumerary Police led by British Army officer 1938

== See also ==
- Notrim
  - Jewish Settlement Police
