= Notrim =

Jewish police force set up by the British in Mandatory Palestine

- נוטרים
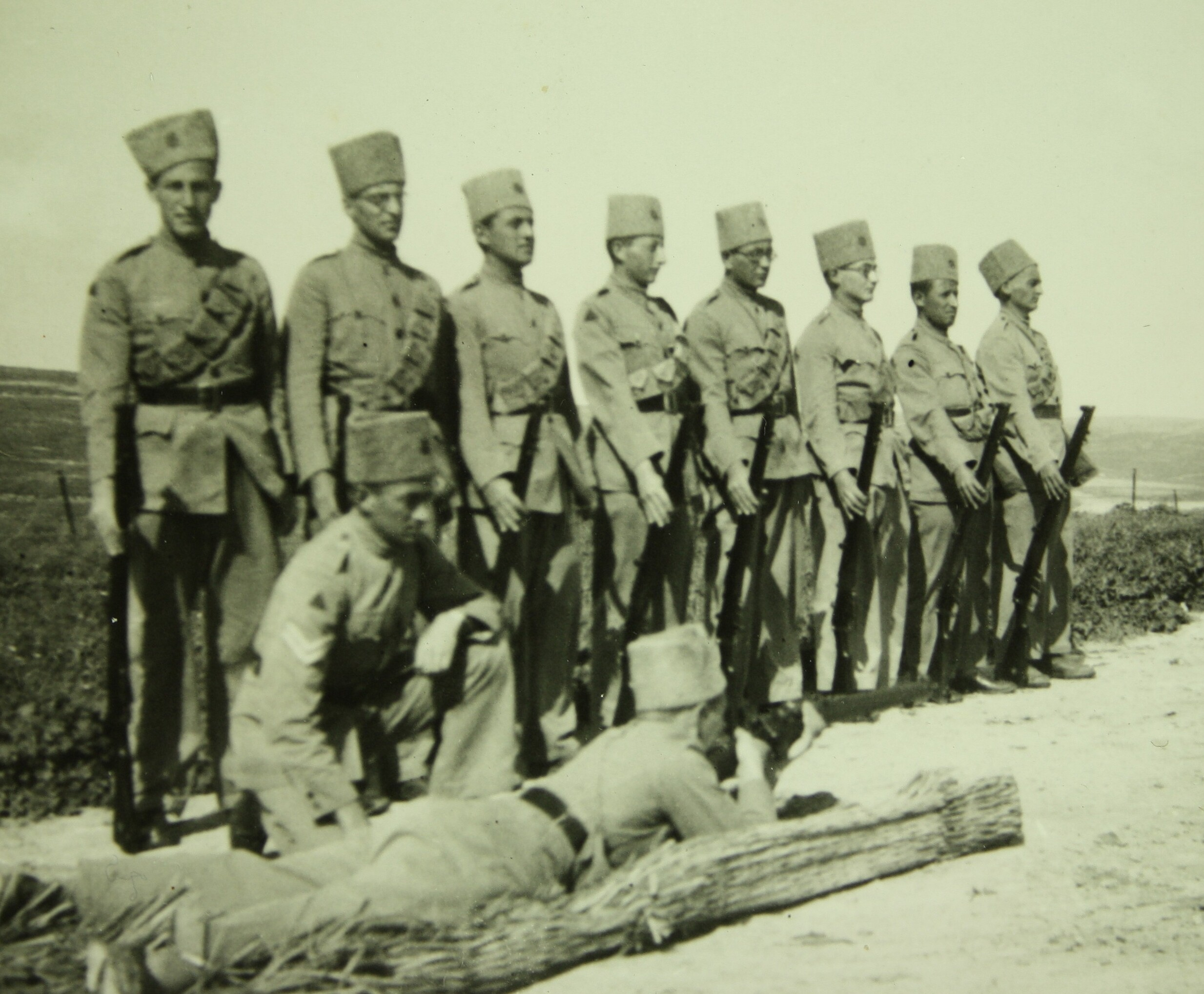
- Notrim in Bat Shlomo, 1939
- Active: 1936–1948
- Disbanded: 1948
- Country: Mandatory Palestine
- Allegiance: Haganah
- Type: Auxiliary police, militia
- Role: Security police, law enforcement, defence of Jewish settlements
- Size: Thousands (exact numbers varied)
- Part of: Palestine Police Force
- Garrison/HQ: Jewish settlements in Palestine
- Engagements: 1936–1939 Arab revolt in Palestine, World War II

The Notrim (Hebrew: נוטרים, lit. 'Guards'; singular: Noter) were mostly Jewish auxiliaries, mainly police, set up in 1936 by the British in Mandatory Palestine during the 1936–39 Arab revolt. The British authorities maintained, financed and armed the Notrim until the end of the Mandate in 1948. The Notrim were nominally answerable to the Palestine Police Force, but were in fact controlled by the Haganah.

== Jewish units during the Arab Revolt (1936–39) ==
During the Arab revolt, the British Mandate authorities needed local manpower specifically to help with defending the borders of Mandatory Palestine from guerrilla infiltrators coming from French-ruled Syria and Lebanon, and to protect the Iraq Petroleum pipeline crossing northern Palestine to the port of Haifa. Once equipped and trained, the Notrim units helped protect Jewish lives and property. The Hebrew term was used collectively for members of any of three Jewish organisations authorised by the British: the largest was the highly mobile Jewish Settlement Police, followed by the ghafirs or Supernumerary Police, a lightly armed Jewish "militia-police", and by guides for the British army patrols. Members were recruited almost entirely from the Jewish underground militia, the Haganah. The ghafir (also spelled ghaffir) concept was not new; first set up as locally organised village guards in brigand-infested Egypt of the 19th century, they were adopted into a new national police under Lord Kitchener, provided with weapons, trained and paid by the government to whom they answered, while also remaining under the command of the local community leadership.

As notrim thousands of young men had their first experience of military training, which Moshe Shertok and Eliyahu Golomb cited as one of the fruits of the Haganah's policy of havlagah (restraint).

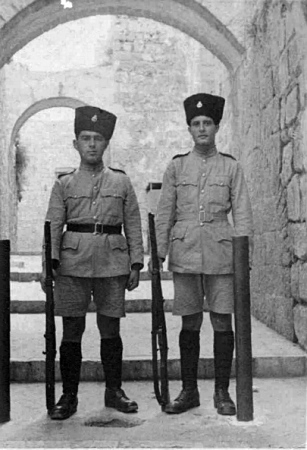
Notrim – "ghafirs" (Jewish Supernumerary Police) 1937

== World War II ==
On 6 August 1940 Anthony Eden, the British War Secretary, informed Parliament that the Cabinet had decided to recruit Arab and Jewish units as battalions of the Royal East Kent Regiment (the "Buffs"). At a luncheon with Chaim Weizmann on 3 September, Winston Churchill approved the large-scale recruitment of Jewish forces in Palestine and the training of their officers. A further 10,000 men (no more than 3,000 from Palestine) were to be recruited to Jewish units in the British Army for training in the United Kingdom.

Faced with Field Marshal Rommel's advance in Egypt, the British government decided on 15 April 1941 that the 10,000 Jews dispersed in the single defence companies of the Buffs should be prepared for war service at the battalion level and that another 10,000 should also be mobilised along with 6,000 Supernumerary Police and 40,000 to 50,000 home guard. The plans were approved by Field Marshal John Dill.

The Special Operations Executive in Cairo approved a Haganah proposal for guerilla activities in northern Palestine led by the Palmach, as part of which Yitzhak Sadeh devised "Plan North" for an armed enclave in the Carmel range from which the Yishuv could defend the region and attack Nazi communications and supply lines, if necessary. British intelligence also trained a small radio network under Moshe Dayan to act as spy cells in the event of a German invasion.

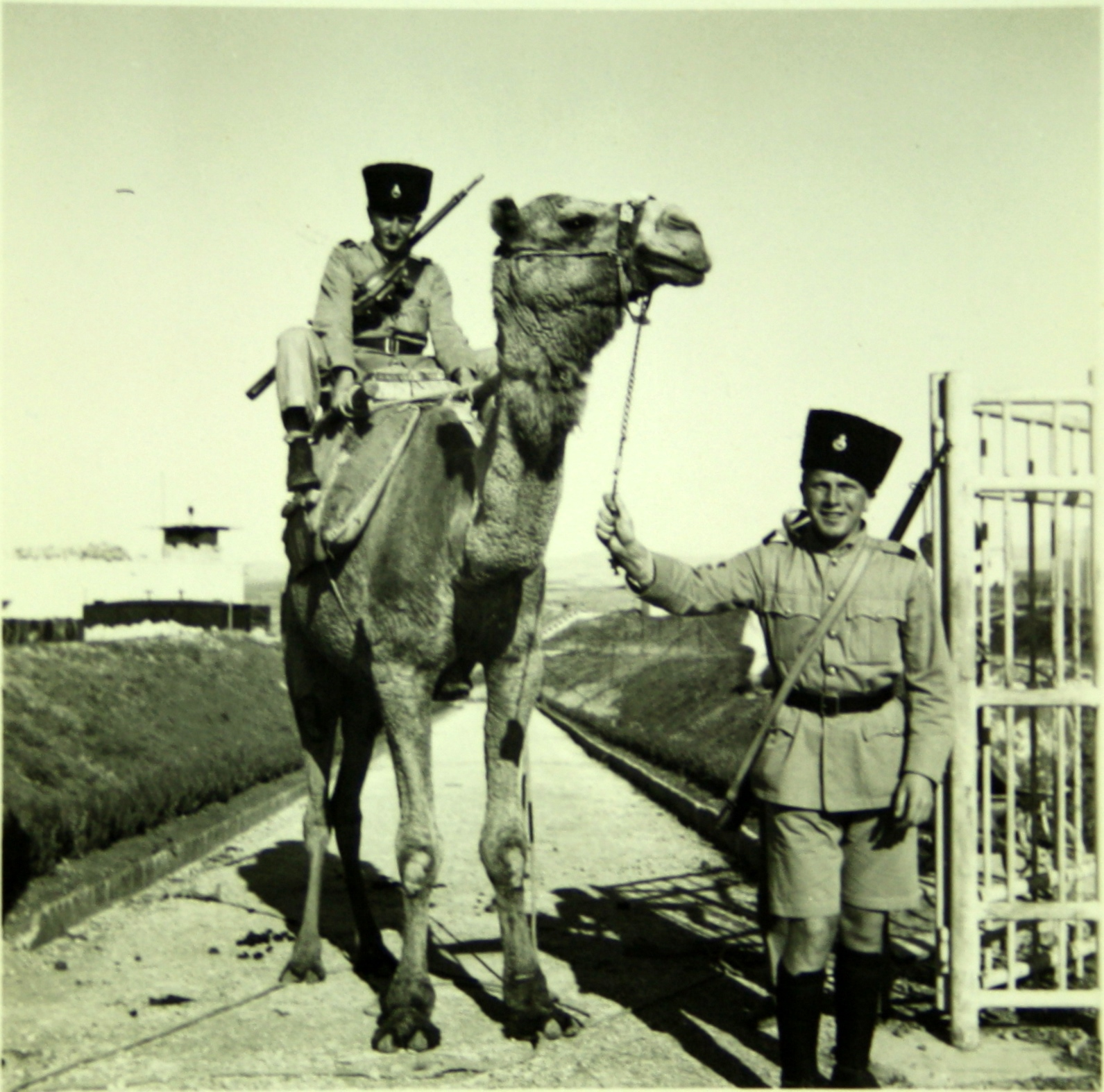
Notrim in Saris police station, 1939. Courtesy of the National Library of Israel.

== 1945-48 and aftermath ==
The end of the Second World War in Europe marked a sharp political change in Mandate Palestine.

After World War II, the Notrim became the core of the Israeli Military Police.

== See also ==
- Jewish Supernumerary Police
- Mobile Guards

== Bibliography ==
- Brown, Nathan (April 1990). "Brigands and State Building: The Invention of Banditry in Modern Egypt". Comparative Studies in Society and History. 32 (2). Cambridge University Press: 258–281. doi:10.1017/S0010417500016480. JSTOR 178915. S2CID 145501821.
- Horowitz, Dan (1989). Baruch Kimmerling (ed.). Before the State: Communal Politics in Palestine Under the Mandate. SUNY series in Israeli Studies. SUNY Press. p. 38. ISBN 978-0-88706-850-8.
- Katz, Samuel (1988). Israeli Elite Units Since 1948. Vol. Text not accessible online. Osprey Publishing. p. 3. ISBN 978-0-85045-837-4.
- Katzberg, Allan A. (1988). "Foundations Of Excellence: Moshe Dayan And Israel's Military Tradition (1880 To 1950)".
- Penkower, Monty Noam (2002). Decision on Palestine Deferred: America, Britain and Wartime Diplomacy, 1939-1945. Israeli History, Politics, and Society. Vol. Text not accessible online. London: Routledge. pp. 112–113. ISBN 0-7146-5268-7.
- Shapira, Anita (1999) [1992]. Land and Power: The Zionist Resort to Force, 1881-1948. Stanford University Press (revised reprint of Oxford UP edition). p. 250. ISBN 978-0-8047-3776-0.
