= Mobile Guards =

The Mobile Guards (Hebrew: המשמר הנע, romanized: Hamishmar hana), also known as the Manim from the initials of the Hebrew words, were a branch of the Notrim in Mandatory Palestine established at the beginning of the 1936–39 Arab revolt in Palestine to ambush Arab terrorists and to protect Jewish settlements and workers in their orchards and fields.

There were about 60 units comprising 400 men. The manim travelled in armored vehicles.
