= 634 =

Calendar year

634 in various calendars
| Gregorian calendar | 634; DCXXXIV |
| Ab urbe condita | 1387 |
| Armenian calendar | 83; ԹՎ ՁԳ |
| Assyrian calendar | 5384 |
| Balinese saka calendar | 555–556 |
| Bengali calendar | 40–41 |
| Berber calendar | 1584 |
| Buddhist calendar | 1178 |
| Burmese calendar | −4 |
| Byzantine calendar | 6142–6143 |
| Chinese calendar | 癸巳年 (Water Snake); 3331 or 3124 — to — 甲午年 (Wood Horse); 3332 or 3125 |
| Coptic calendar | 350–351 |
| Discordian calendar | 1800 |
| Ethiopian calendar | 626–627 |
| Hebrew calendar | 4394–4395 |
- Hindu calendars
| Vikram Samvat | 690–691 |
| Shaka Samvat | 555–556 |
| Kali Yuga | 3734–3735 |
| Holocene calendar | 10634 |
| Iranian calendar | 12–13 |
| Islamic calendar | 12–13 |
| Japanese calendar | N/A |
| Javanese calendar | 524–525 |
| Julian calendar | 634; DCXXXIV |
| Korean calendar | 2967 |
| Minguo calendar | 1278 before ROC 民前1278年 |
| Nanakshahi calendar | −834 |
| Seleucid era | 945/946 AG |
| Thai solar calendar | 1176–1177 |
| Tibetan calendar | ཆུ་མོ་སྦྲུལ་ལོ་ (female Water-Snake); 760 or 379 or −393 — to — ཤིང་ཕོ་རྟ་ལོ་ (male Wood-Horse); 761 or 380 or −392 |

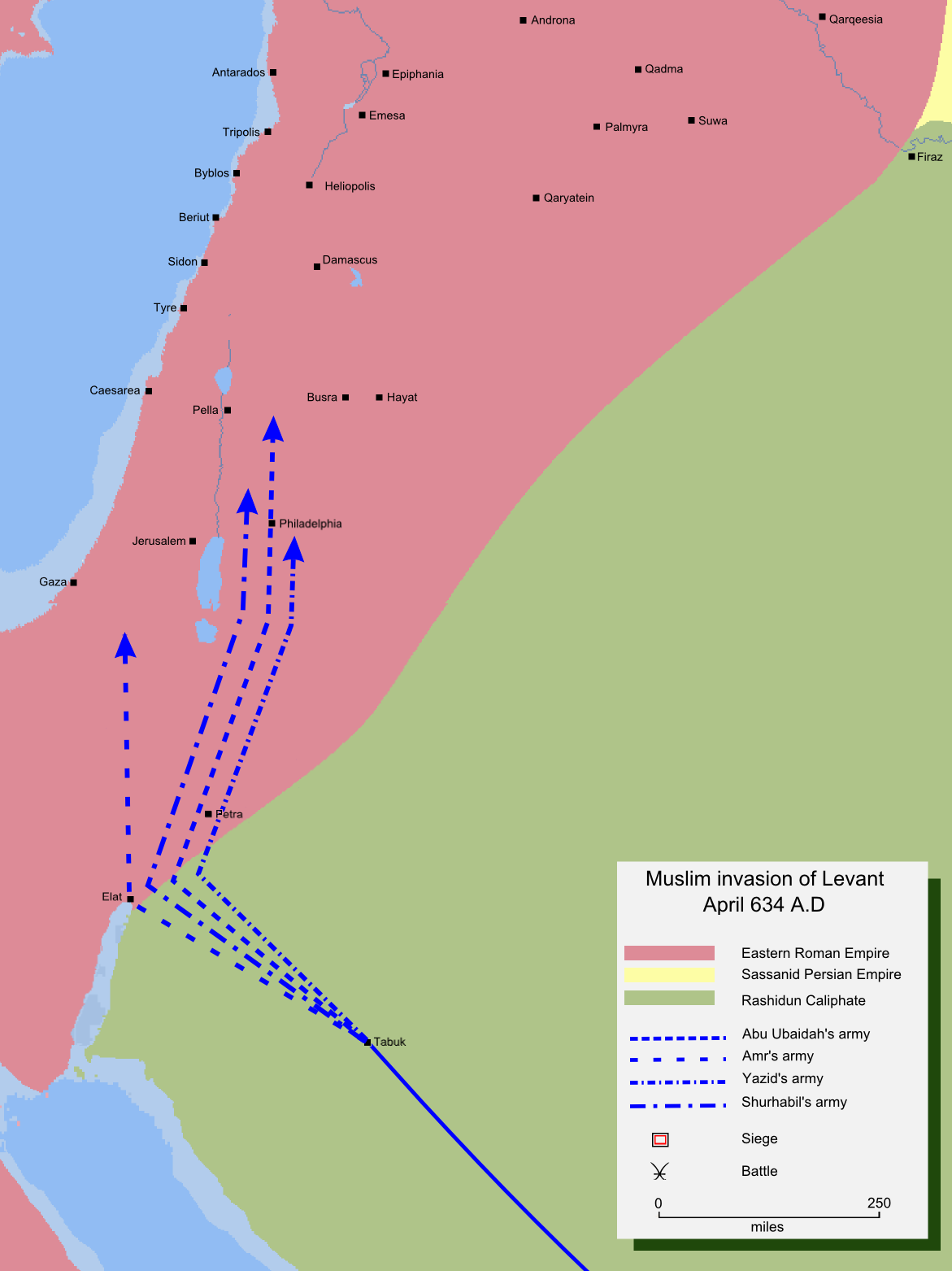
The Rashidun Caliphate invade the Levant

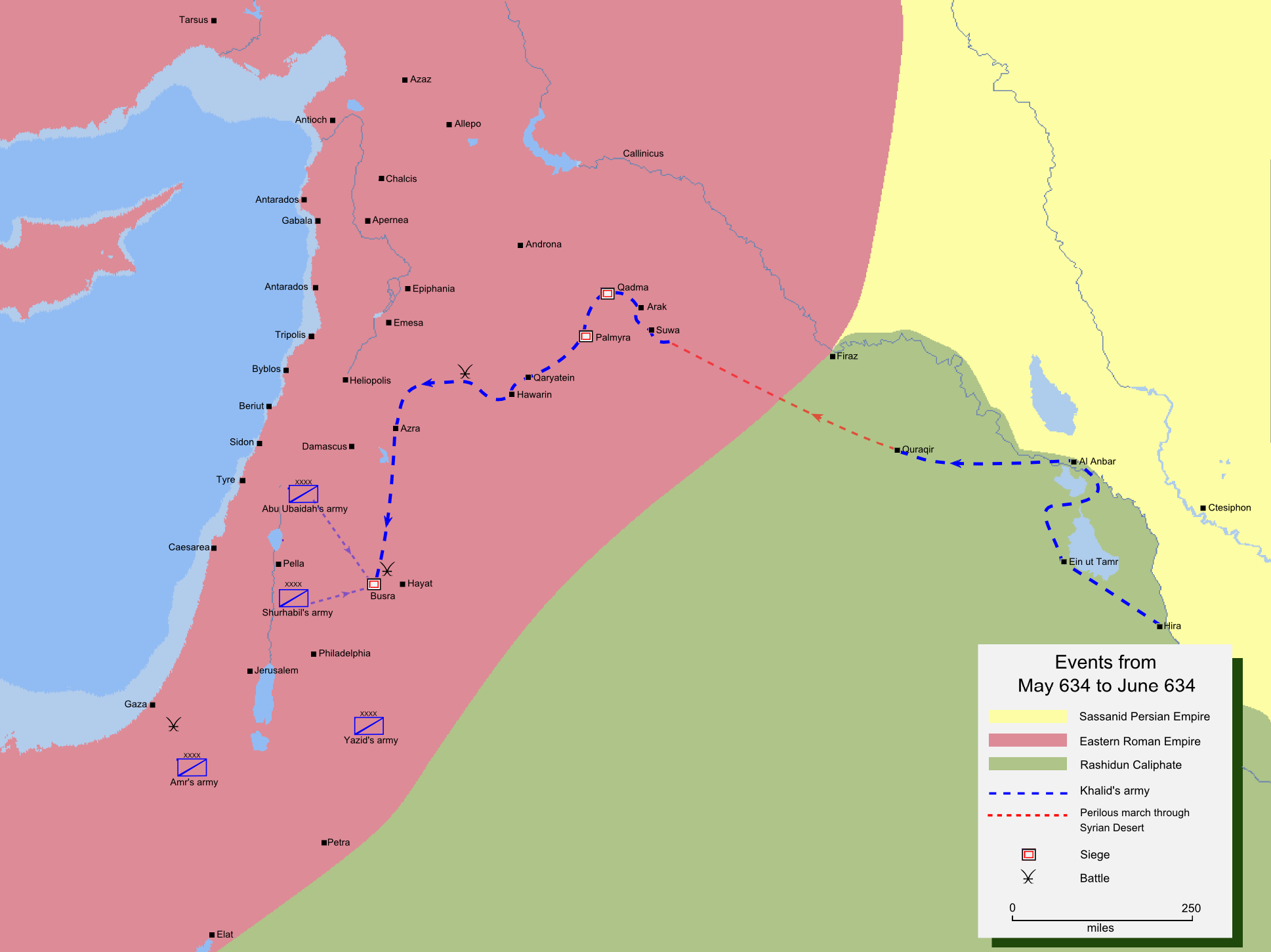
Muslim invasion of Khalid ibn al-Walid in Syria

Year 634 (DCXXXIV) was a common year starting on Saturday of the Julian calendar. The denomination 634 for this year has been used since the early medieval period, when the Anno Domini calendar era became the prevalent method in Europe for naming years.

== Events ==
=== By place ===
==== Byzantine Empire ====
- Arab–Byzantine War: Emperor Heraclius, ill, infirm, and unpopular with the Eastern Orthodox Church, is unable to personally lead the Byzantine army to resist the Muslim conquest of the Levant. He sends his brother Theodore to assemble forces to retake the newly won Muslim territories. Monophysites and Jews throughout Syria welcome the Arab invaders, as they are discontented with Byzantine rule.
- July 30 – Battle of Ajnadayn: Byzantine forces (90,000 men according to Muslim sources) under Theodore are defeated by the Rashidun Caliphate near Beit Shemesh (modern-day Israel). Heraclius, who is in Emesa, flees to Antioch upon hearing news of the battle's outcome.

==== Europe ====
- King Dagobert I is forced by the Austrasian nobles to put his 3-year-old son Sigebert III on the throne, ceding royal power in Austrasia. He frees himself from dependence on Pepin of Landen, and extends his rule over the Bretons (approximate date).

==== Britain ====
- Eanfrith of Bernicia and his bodyguard are killed by King Cadwallon of Gwynedd, in an attempt to negotiate peace. Eanfrith's brother Oswald returns from 18 years exile in Dál Riata (modern Scotland), to claim the crown of Northumbria.
- Battle of Heavenfield: Oswald, possibly accompanied by a force of Scots (or Picts), defeats and kills Cadwallon with a Welsh army near Hexham (northern England). He reunites Deira with Bernicia, and becomes king of Northumbria.

==== Persia ====
- Battle of the Bridge: Persian forces (10,000 men) under Bahman Jadhuyih defeat the Muslim Arabs at the Euphrates (near Kufa). The sight of elephants panics the Muslims, and many are killed. Bahman does not pursue the fleeing Arab army.

==== Arabia ====
- Battle of Firaz: The Rashidun Arabs (15,000 men) under Khalid ibn al-Walid defeat the combined forces of the Byzantine Empire, Persian Empire and Arab Christians (at least 10 times larger than Khalid's army) in Mesopotamia (Iraq).
- February 4 – Battle of Dathin: Rashidun forces under Yazid ibn Abi Sufyan defeat the Christian Arabs around Gaza. The Muslim victory is celebrated by the local Jews, who have been a persecuted minority within the Byzantine Empire.
- The Rashidun Caliphate starts the Islamic conquest of the Byzantine Empire, when Muslim forces under Abu Ubaidah ibn al-Jarrah invade the Levant. Khalid sets out for Syria from Al-Hirah, taking with him half his army, about 8,000 strong.
- Battle of al-Qaryatayn: The Muslim Arabs under Khalid defeat the Ghassanids at Al-Qaryatayn, after the inhabitants resist his proposals. His army conquers and plunders the city, before proceeding to capture other towns in the area.
- Battle of Marj Rahit: A Muslim Arab army under Khalid defeats the Byzantine forces (15,000 men) and their Ghassanid allies. After the battle he sends a mounted column to the outskirts of Damascus, to plunder the region.
- Battle of Bosra: Muslim forces under Khalid besiege the Byzantine and Christian Arab garrison (12,000 men) at Bosra. After a few days the fortress city surrenders; Khalid imposes a payment of tribute on the inhabitants.
- August 23 – Abu Bakr dies at Medina and is succeeded by Umar I, who becomes the second caliph (khalifah) of the Rashidun Caliphate. During his rule, Umar conquers Syria, Persia, and Egypt in a "Holy War".
- September 19 – Siege of Damascus: Muslim Arabs under Khalid conquer Damascus as the first major city of the Byzantine Empire. Damascan refugees are given a guarantee of safety to retreat to Antioch.
- Battle of Maraj-al-Debaj: A Byzantine convoy of Damascan refugees (10,000 men) is slaughtered by a Muslim army near Antioch. The Mobile Guard (elite light cavalry) captures a great amount of brocade.

==== Asia ====
- The Tuyuhun Kingdom is invaded by Chinese forces under Li Jing (Tang dynasty) during Emperor Taizong's campaign against Tuyuhun, resulting in the murder of their leader (khan) Murong Fuyun in 635.
- Tai Zong orders the construction of the Daming Palace in Chang'an. He builds the summer palace for his retired father, Emperor Gao Zu, as an act of filial piety.

=== By topic ===
==== Religion ====
- Aidan of Lindisfarne, Irish missionary, is summoned by King Oswald from Iona (Inner Hebrides) to establish a bishopric on the holy island of Lindisfarne, and reestablish Christianity in Northumbria (approximate date).
- Birinus, Frankish missionary, lands at the port of "Hamwic" (now in the St. Mary's area of Southampton), on his mission to reconvert the West Saxons in England. About this time, the St Mary's Church is founded.
- Sophronius becomes patriarch of Jerusalem. He sends synodical letters to Pope Honorius I and the Eastern patriarchs, explaining the Orthodox belief, by renouncing Monothelitism.

== Births ==
- Athanasius II Baldoyo, patriarch of Antioch (d. 686)
- Chad of Mercia, Anglo-Saxon abbot (d. 672)
- Cuthbert, Anglo-Saxon bishop (approximate date)
- En no Ozunu, Japanese ascetic (approximate date)

== Deaths ==
- August 23 – Abu Bakr, Muslim Caliph
- Cadwallon, king of Gwynedd (Wales)
- Eanfrith, king of Bernicia (northern England)
- Sigeberht, king of East Anglia (approximate date)
