= Rashidun cavalry =

Cavalry forces of the Muslim Rashidun Caliphate

- Army of the marches (Jaish al‐Zaḥf Arabic: جيش الزحف); Mobile guard (Tulai'a Mutaharrika Arabic: طليعة متحركة); The Army of Sharpeners
- Active: 632–661
- Allegiance: Rashidun Caliphate
- Type: Cavalry
- Role: Shock troops Flanking maneuver Mounted archery Siege; Expeditionary warfare Reconnaissance; Raid; Horse breeding
- Provincial Headquarters (Amsar): Medina (632–657); Kufa (657–661); Jund Hims (634–661); Jund Dimashq (635–661); Jund al-Urdunn (639–661); Basra (632–661); Jund Filastin (660–661); Fustat (641–661)
- Engagements: Ridda wars; Early Muslim conquests; First Fitna

Commanders
- Supreme Commanders: Khalid ibn al-Walid; Abu Ubayda ibn al-Jarrah; Sa'd ibn Abi Waqqas; Amr ibn al-As
- Notable Commanders: Zubayr ibn al-Awwam; Al-Qa'qa' ibn Amr al-Tamimi; Hashim ibn Utba; Amr ibn Ma'adi Yakrib; Dirar ibn al-Azwar

The Fursān (cavalrymen) of the Rashidun army constituted the mounted arm of early Muslim forces during the Muslim conquest of Syria. Within this arm, an elite cavalry formation emerged that later sources and modern historians commonly describe as the Mobile Guard (Arabic: طليعة متحركة, ṭalīʿa mutaḥarrika, or Arabic: الحرس المتحرك, al-ḥaras al-mutaḥarrik), sometimes also referred to as the Marching Army (جيش الزحف, Jaish al-Zaḥf). This formation was commanded by Khalid ibn al-Walid, who organized it as a centralized body of cavalry under his direct control rather than dispersing it among the infantry formations. The unit was composed largely of experienced horsemen drawn from earlier campaigns in Arabia, Iraq, Syria, and Palestine, resulting in a concentration of battle-hardened veterans with prior experience fighting the Byzantine and Sasanian empires.

In battle, the Mobile Guard was typically held in reserve during the initial phase of engagement and committed at critical moments, often against exposed flanks, overextended formations, or to counter enemy breakthroughs. Its mobility allowed it to shift rapidly across the battlefield, conduct flanking attacks, reinforce threatened sectors, and exploit enemy disorganization once contact had been made by the main army. After successful engagements, elements of the formation were frequently employed in pursuit operations, contributing to the breakdown and retreat of opposing forces. The unit played a significant role in major engagements against the Byzantine and Sasanian empires, including the Battle of Chains, Battle of Walaja, Battle of Ajnadayn, Battle of Firaz, Battle of Marj al-Dibaj, the Siege of Damascus, the Battle of the Yarmuk, the Battle of Hazir, and the Battle of the Iron Bridge. Elements of this cavalry force later operated under Al-Qa'qa' ibn Amr al-Tamimi, participating in the Battle of al-Qadisiyyah, Battle of Jalula, and the Second Siege of Emesa.

This cavalry unit likely rode horses of Arabian lineage, reflecting the emphasis placed on horse breeding by early Islamic communities, where equestrian traditions were closely integrated with military practice. Horses of this type were widespread among Arab populations during the 6th and 7th centuries.

== History ==
Muhammad's cavalry, the predecessor of the caliphate's, is recorded to have had 10,000 horsemen during the Expedition of Tabuk. The Muslim cavalry units were commonly called Fursan.

After the decisive victory at the Battle of Ajnadayn in 634 CE, Khalid, from his Iraqi army, which after Ajnadayn numbered about 8000 men, organised a force of 4000 horsemen, which the early historians refer to as The Army of Sharpeners. Khalid kept this force under his personal command. Aside from horses for use in attacks, the Rashidun cavalry also rode camels for transportation and in defensive battles, as camels could repel even heavy cavalry such as Byzantine and Sassanid cataphracts, and are large enough to withstand a heavy cavalry's charge. At the onset of the Battle of Yarmuk in 636 AD, around 3,000 cavalry reinforcements were sent to the Syrian front, including those from Yemen led by Qays ibn Makshuh.

Mahmud Shakir said the cavalry corps called al-Haras al-Mutaharikkah, had a distinguishing role in the battle of Yarmuk. The first recorded use of this mounted force was during the Siege of Damascus. During the battle of Yarmuk Khalid ibn Walid used them to his advantage at critical points in the battle. With their ability to engage and disengage, and turn back and attack again from the flank or rear, the Mobile Guard inflicted a shattering defeat of the Byzantine army. This strong mobile striking force was often used in later years as an advance guard. It could rout opposing armies with its greater mobility that gave it an upper hand against any Byzantine army. One of the victories of the mobile guard was at Battle of Hazir in 637 CE under the command of Khalid, in which not a single Byzantine soldier survived. The Mobile guard remained under the personal command of Khalid ibn Walid for about four years (634-638 CE) until Khalid was dismissed from the army by Caliph Umar after the completion of the conquest of the Levant.

With the dismissal of Khalid, this powerful cavalry regiment was dismantled. One of its commanders Al-Qa'qa' ibn Amr al-Tamimi had been sent to the Persian front in 637 CE along with reinforcements for the Battle of al-Qadisiyyah, in which he played an important part. A part of it was later sent to the Persian front as reinforcements for the Muslim conquest of Persia. Many of its members died in the plague during 639-640 CE which killed approximately 25,000 Muslims in Syria. This included many sub-commanders of the mobile guard like Dirar ibn al-Azwar, those who survived accompanied the army under the command of Amr ibn al-As to conquer Egypt. After the conquest of Egypt, the Rashidun Army continued to invade and besiege Bahnasa, as the enemy were reinforced by an arrival of 50,000 according to the report of al-Maqqari. The siege dragged for months, until Khalid ibn al Walid commanded Zubayr ibn al-Awwam, Dirar ibn al-Azwar and other commanders to intensify the siege and assign them to lead around 10,000 Companions of the Prophet, with 70 among them were veterans of battle of Badr. They besiege the city for 4 months as Dirar leading 200 horsemens, while Zubayr ibn Al-Awwam lead 300 horsemen, while the other commanders such as Miqdad, Abd Allah ibn Umar and Uqba ibn Amir al-Juhani leading similar number with Dirar with each command 200 horsemens. After Bahnasa finally subdued, where they camped in a village which later renamed as Qays village, in honor of Qays ibn Harith, the overall commander of these Rashidun cavalry. The Byzantines and their copt allies showering the Rashidun army with arrows and stones from the city wall, As the bitter fights has rages on as casualties increases, (Note: Waqidi recorded that around 5,000 Sahabah were fallen during this battle.) until the Rashidun overcame the defenders, as Dirar, the first emerge, came out from the battle with his entire body stained in blood, while confessed he has slayed about 160 Byzantine soldiers during the battle. Chroniclers recorded the Rashidun army has finally breached the city gate under either Khalid ibn al-Walid or Qays ibn al-Harith finally managed to breach the gate and storming the city and forcing surrender to the inhabitant. (Note: The first version narrated the siege of Bahnasa were led by Khalid ibn al-Walid, who also brought an ex Sassanid Marzban and his 2,000 Persian convert soldiers in this campaign. The Persian Marzban suggested to Khalid to form a suicide squad who will carry a wooden box filled with mixture of sulphur and oil and placing it at the gates, ignited it and blasting the gates (or melting the iron gate, according to the original translation), allowing the Muslim army to enter the city.) (Note: The second version were the Muslim army led by Qays ibn Harith without much details of how the Muslims managed to subdue the city. This source said that Qays ibn Harith name were used temporarily to rename Oxyrhynchus for while to honor his deeds in this campaign, before being renamed to be al-Bahnasa.)

Later, some of the caliphate's horsemen rebelled against the caliphate under Hurqus ibn Zuhayr as-Sa'di, a Tamimi tribe chieftain and veteran of the Battle of Hunayn. Hurqus joined with another warrior tribe from Bajila, led by Abd Allah ibn Wahb al-Rasibi, who participated in the early conquests of Persia under Sa'd ibn Abi Waqqas.

As Muslim conquests of North Africa and the Iberian Peninsula progressed. they also brought their breeds of horse to Africa and Spain in the form of Arabian horses, Barb horses, and to a lesser extent the Turkoman horse

== Unit characteristics ==
Cavalry were highly regarded by the military rulers of early Medina, as the early Medina Islam constitution and the Caliphates' put emphasis by giving the cavalry troopers at least two portions of war spoils and booty compared to regular soldier, while regular infantry only received a single portion. The core of the caliphate's mounted division was an elite unit which early Muslim historians named Tulai'a Mutaharrika (طليعة متحركة), or the mobile guard.

Initially, the nucleus of the mobile guard formed from veterans of the horsemens under Khalid ibn al-Walid during the conquest of Iraq. They consisted half of the forces brought by Khalid from Iraq to Syria 4.000 soldiers out of 8.000 soldiers. This shock cavalry division played important roles in the victories at the Battle of Chains, Battle of Walaja, Battle of Ajnadayn, Battle of Firaz, Battle of Maraj-al-Debaj, Siege of Damascus, Battle of Yarmouk, Battle of Hazir and the Battle of Iron Bridge against the Byzantine and the Sassanid. Later, a splinter of this cavalry division under Al-Qa'qa ibn Amr at-Tamimi was also involved in the Battle of al-Qadisiyyah, Battle of Jalula, and the Second siege of Emesa.

=== Equipment ===
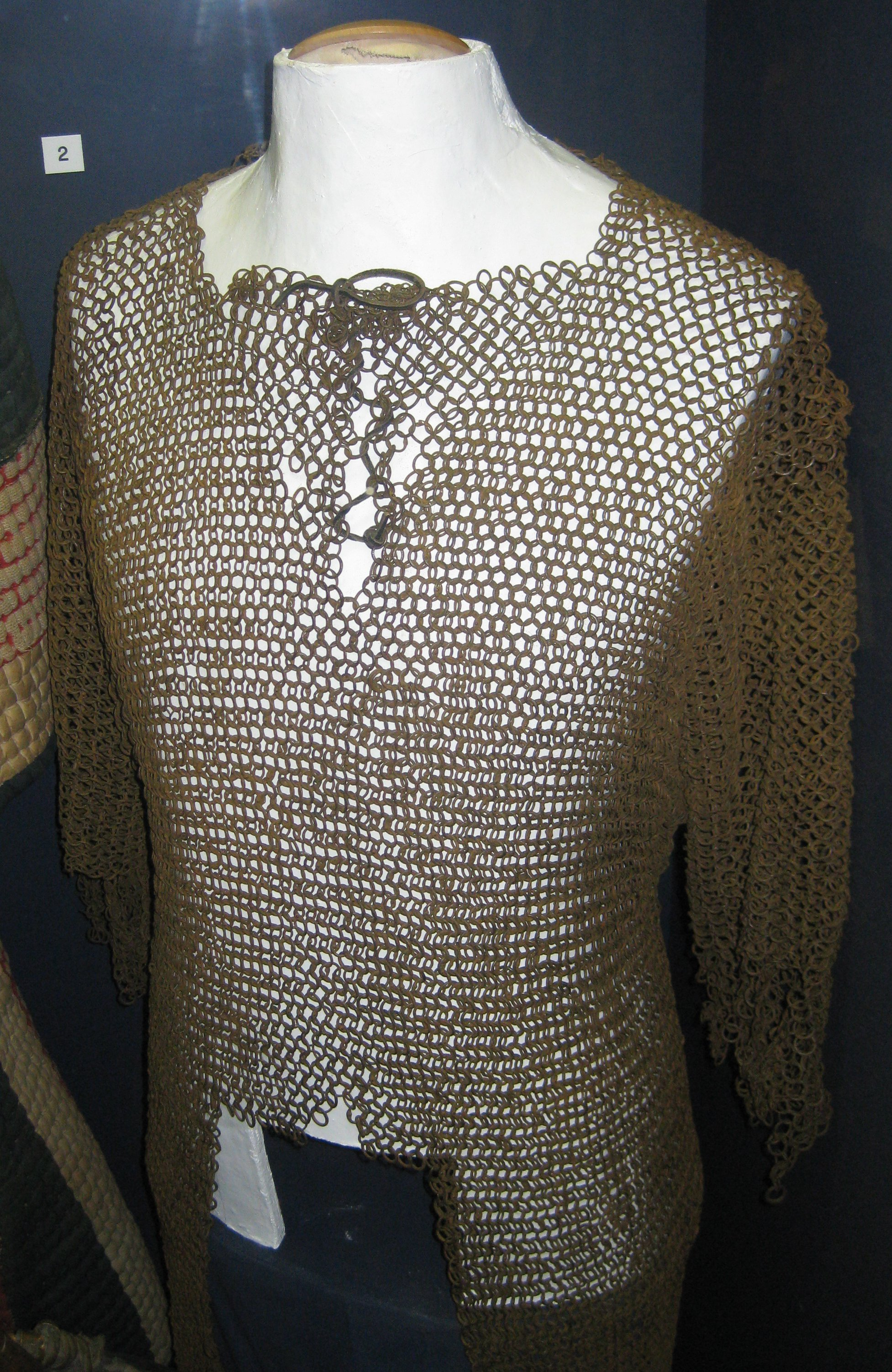
Chain mail

Contrary to popular belief among historians, that the Arabians during the 6th century were unarmored light cavalry raiders, Eduard Alofs argues that the Arab horsemen, whether they are Rashiduns, Ghassanids, or Lakhmids were in fact heavily armoured elite nobles, (Note: The nobility of the Nomad Arabs were based on tribal militaristic meritocracy and genealogical (both their own and their horses') supremacy, according to Elizabeth E. Bacon) akin to Cataphract in armors. (Note: Alofs's claims were based from medieval sources such as Strategikon, History of Tabari, and others.) The Muslim army in time of Muhammad also had a particular type of body armour called "al-Kharnaq", which was characterized as flexible.

For their armaments, the Early Arabic horsemen are theoretically used the following arms in battle:

- Arab sword of various types, one of the most famous types is as-Sayf al-Qala'i, a curved sword type. Muhammad owned this type of sword which preserved in modern-day in Topkapı Palace museum, the sword blade were around 100 cm length which has inscription in its hilt: "Hadha Sayf al-Mashrafi li Bayt Muhammad Rasulullah". The Indian manufactured swords which used by Arabs during Muhammad era were straight and double edged. certain cavalry commanders such as Amr ibn Ma'adi Yakrib, also known to possess multiple swords. while Khalid ibn al-Walid reportedly brought at least nine swords during single battle.
- Lance used by Rashidun cavalry by swinging them during close-combat, such as in the record of record of Tabari. Early caliphate cavalry held their Lance overhead posture with both hands. A personal lance belong to Muhammad consisted a lance which head was made of brass.
- Mounted archery with flying gallop was practiced casually by Rashidun caliphate onwards, as it was used by early Muslim warriors such as Sa'd ibn Abi Waqqas, who are reported as an expert for retreating mounted shot Their quivers were reportedly contained 50 arrows. Leaders and commanders also obliged the usage of bows, as there are records of Muhammad himself of usage of the bow during the battle of Uhud.
- Javelins also used by caliphate horsemens' their weapon. Zubayr ibn al-Awwam, a seasoned Muhajirun and early convert who always brought horses during battles, were recorded have killed his enemies with javelin in at least in two occasions during his life. The first occasion when he recorded has killed Qurayshi nobleman Ubayda ibn Sa'id from Umayyad clan during the Battle of Badr, who was wearing a full set of armor and Aventail that protected his entire body and face. Zubayr hurled his javelin aiming at the unprotected eye of Ubayda and killed him immediately. The second occasion is during the Battle of Khaybar, Zubayr fought in a duel against a Jewish nobleman Yassir which Zubayr killed with a powerful javelin strike. Firsthand witnesses reported that Zubayr brandishing himself across the battlefield during the Battle of Hunayn while hung two javelins in his back.
- Rounded shield to protect the rider from arrows.

==== Armour and horse armour ====
Regarding their defensive and supporting equipments, despite there is not yet archeological proof of Arabian armory before the era of Ayyubid and Mamluk found, literary sources indicates the Arabs already using body armour, such as coat of Chain mail called Dir that was found from the literary sources from the era before the advent of Islam, or as an Umayyad poetries that mentioned the armour of the caliphate army during caliph Umar until Umayyad era. During the Battle of Uhud, Jami'at Tirmidhi recorded Zubayr ibn al-Awwam testimony that Muhammad wearing two layers of mail coat. However, there is still not yet archaeological founding of Arabic armor in such time. Waqidi recorded the Qurayshite Arab horsemens also using horse armor which held by Crupper on the back of the horse, which are used by a Qurayshite warrior named Hubayr ibn Abi Wahb al Makhzumi during the battle of the Trench.

The Muslim Arabic cavalry during early caliphate already knew of stirrups. However, caliph Umar forbid or neglected the use of stirrups for his soldiers as riding without stirrups could train riders better for horsemanship. Despite the rejection or neglect of stirrups, Arab cavalry, especially the Kharijites group who will revolt after the conquest, were feared for their fearless charge, which, as Adam Ali mentioned in his work on al-Jahiz, "can throw any defense line into disarray". Military history reconstructors like Marcus Junkelmann have determined from historical reenactment that mounted close combat specialists like Mubarizuns could fight effectively on top of their mounts without stirrups. This is used by Alofs as an argument to debunk the assertion held by most historians that horsemen cannot fight effectively in close combat without the use of stirrups.

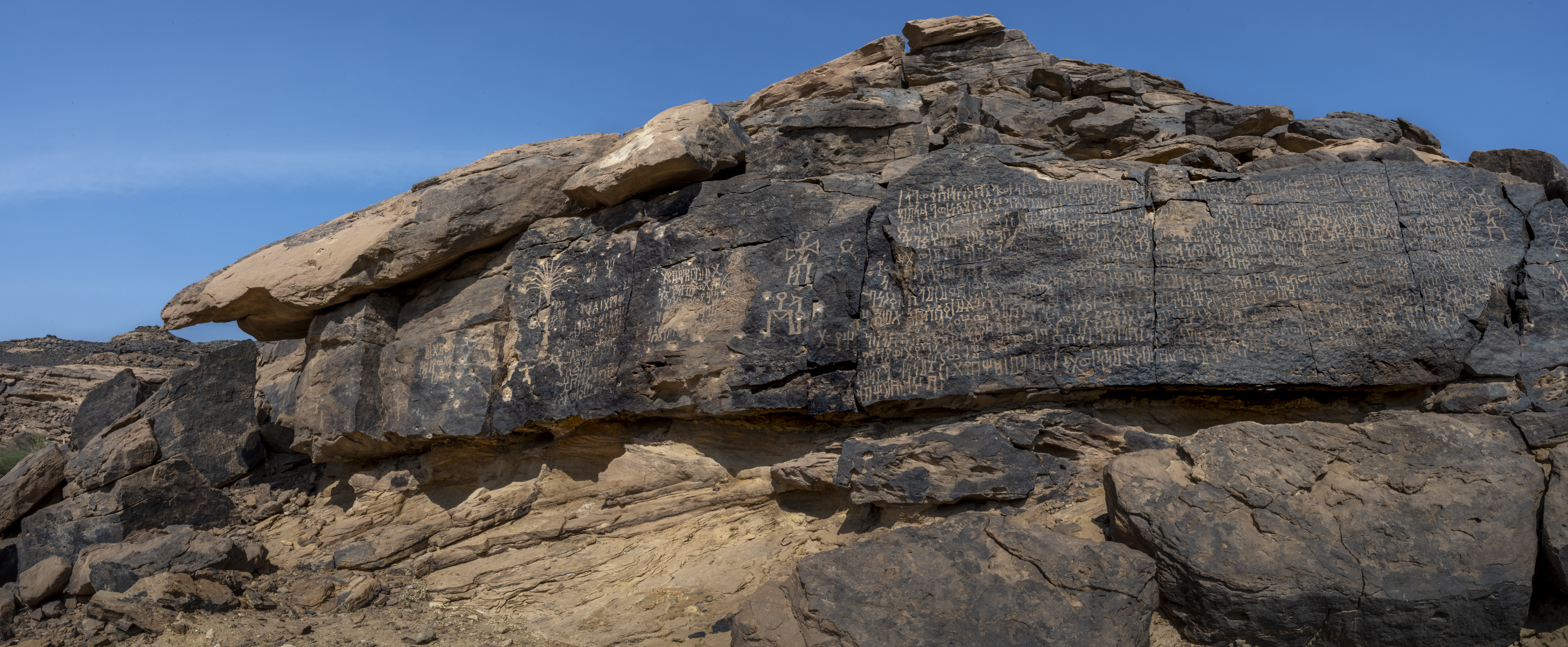
Inscriptions of Hima mountain

David Nicolle brought the theory of Pre-Islamic Arabia Arabic-speaking peoples adoption of armory among horsemen as he quoted Claude Cahen, who categorically stated that horse armor was very common in the early Islamic period. Nicolle thought those Arabians were exposed to external culture influences such as from external military influence from Turkish Uyghurs, originating in Xinjiang, which then spread further to Iran and beyond, eventually reaching the Middle east, Nicolle divided the evidence from three pinpoint areas:

1. Dura-Europos, located in Syrian borderlands of the Byzantine Empire, where horse armor of bronze scales, Roman Syria or Parthian origin, from the 3rd century AD are found. Although Nicolle dismissed the Byzantines as being unlikely as heavily armoured cavalry were not Byzantine tradition in the first place, and only adopted such in the late era, unlike the Persians.
2. Shabwa, Yemen, as Nicole pointed there is carved plaque depicting armoured cavalry, both the rider and the horse, which Nicolle surmised originated from 6th–early 7th AD, and theoretically were Asawiran Sassanids heavy cavalry who garrisoned Yemen for decades before the expansion of Islam circa 570 to 630 AD. While Ogden pointed out Yemen were also known as an important coastal sea trade between India and the Red Sea since ancient times and were exposed to the latter's metallurgy. the team of Bir Hima archeology excavation and researchers has found southwestern edge of the modern city of Najran, a depiction of a heavily built horse similar in form to the extinct Nisean horse breed which rode by Zaweyan elite troops of Sassanids of the 6th century BCE, which according to the team, indicating Persian influence. Elwyn Hartley Edwards also added it is possible that the Arabs also had influence in the breeding of legendary Nisean horses, since geographically the breed theoritically was bred in western Iran of Medes. Edwards further remarked the possibility that the Nisean were also infused with Arabian horse breed.
3. Wadi Aday, 8 km south of Muttrah, Oman., where Nicolle pointed out many armoured horsemen carvings, armed with spears and a sword, that, according to Nicole, traditionally identified as Arabs. according to researchers, south-eastern Arabia including Oman has for a long time been exposed to Iron since the Iron Age, which presumably is from external influence such as India, just as for Yemen. Regarding this theory, Nicolle suggested the horse armour adopted by Pre-Islamic Oman and Yemen Arabs which he implied from Sasanian Yemen influence.

Aside from those three locations that are pointed by Nicolle, Bir Hima archaeological researchers team also found evidence of Arabian armoured cavalry in the form of hundreds, if not thousands of petroglyphs in Bir Hima, which is located about 30 km northeast of Najran. The excavation sites are dominated by images of mounted cavalry that are highly stylized, which the researchers theorized riding Arabian breed horses. The cavalrymen are armed with long lances, swords, Sayf swords and khanjar daggers which are worn in the waist. The team also notice that there are indication the carvings of those horsemen probably wearing something like helmets and cutlasses.

==== Military standard ====
Before the advent of Islam, banners as tools for signaling had already been employed by the pre-Islamic Arab tribes and the Byzantines. Early Muslim army naturally deployed banners for the same purpose. Early Islamic flags, however, greatly simplified its design by using plain color, due to the Islamic prescriptions on aniconism. According to the Islamic traditions, the Quraysh had a black liwāʾ and a white-and-black rāya. It further states that Muhammad had an ʿalam in white nicknamed "the Young Eagle" (Arabic: العقاب al-ʿuqāb); and a rāya in black, said to be made from his wife Aisha's head-cloth. This larger flag was known as " the Banner of the Eagle" (Arabic: الراية العقاب al-rāyat al-ʻuqāb), as well as "the Black Banner" (Arabic: الراية السوداء ar-rāyat as-sawdāʾ). Other examples are the prominent Arab military commander 'Amr ibn al-'As using red banner, and the Khawarij rebels using red banner as well. Banners of the early Muslim army in general, however, employed a variety of colors, both singly and in combination.

=== Training, tactics and strategy ===
As the mainstay strategy of the Rashidun army was interchangeably and derived from Islamic teaching, the main doctrine of the Rashidun cavalry also borrowed from the religious ethic itself. For example, the aim for building such military sophistication was in fact to cause fear and discourage the enemy from offering resistance, and if possible, cause the enemy to submit peacefully, as is said to be the main idea from a verse in the Quran chapter al-Anfal, verse 8:60.

Aside from that distinguishing role which characterized by the Mobile Guard cavalry were their task to plugging the gaps between Muslim ranks to avoid enemy penetration, which they practiced during the battle of the Yarmuk. During the reign of caliph Umar. The caliph instructed Salman Ibn Rabi'a to establish systematic military program to maintain the quality of caliphate mounts. Salman enlisted most of the steeds within realm of caliphate to undergo such steps:

1. Recording number and quality of horses available.
2. Differences between the Arabian purebreed and the hybrid breeds was to be carefully noted.
3. Arabic structural medical examination and Hippiatrica on each horses in regular basis including isolation and quarantine of sick horses.
4. Regular training between horses and their masters to achieve the disciplined communication between them.
5. Collective response training of the horses done in general routine.
6. Individual response training of the horses on advanced level.
7. Endurance and temperament training to perform in crowded and noisy places.

Meanwhile, technical training method of each horsemen in this cavalry was recorded in al-Fann al-Harbi In- Sadr al-Islam and Tarikh Tabari:

1. Riding horses with saddles.
2. Riding horses without saddles.
3. Sword fighting without horses
4. Horse charging with stabbing weapons.
5. Fighting with swords from the back of a moving horse.
6. Archery.
7. Mounted archery while the horse running.
8. Close combat while changing their seat position on the back of moving horse, facing backwards.

At the end of the program, both riders and horses obligated to enlisted in formal competition sponsored by Diwan al-Jund which consisted into two category:

1. Racing competition to measure the speed and stamina of each hybrids. This racing activities are also encouraged by caliphate commanders such as Abu Ubayda ibn al-Jarrah who himself also engaged in such sport.
2. Acrobat competition to measure the ability of the horses for difficult maneuvers during war.

Additionally, In the wartime, there are special trainings established cavalry divisions were obliged to undertook:

- simulated combat operation raids during the winter and summer seasons, known as Tadrib al-Shawati wa al-Sawd'if, which were intended to maintain the quality of each cavalry forces, while also maintain the pressures towards the Byzantines, Persians, and other caliphate enemies while there is no major military campaign.
- Special drills that required for particular operasion, such as during the Battle of al-Qadisiyyah, The Muslim cavalry undergo drill training that involved by maneuvering their horses nearby elephant dummy statues, to train the horses so they did not afraid during the battle as they were tasked to charge against Sasanian Empire elephant corps

==== Cavalry archery ====
Alof theorized "Mubarizun" elite division, a unit specialized in close combat duels, also used archery in close-combat duels for maximum arrow penetration against opponent armor. This select few apparatus of mounted soldiers who particularly skilled in duel were tasked to find the enemy generals or field officers, in order to kidnap or slay them in close combat, so the enemy will lose their commanding figure amidst of battle. Aside from fighting with swords, lances, or maces, these duel specialists also possessed a unique ability to use archery in close combat, where Alofs theorized that in mid range about five meters from the adversary, the duelists will exchange his lance with his bow and shoot the enemy from close range to achieve maximum penetration, while the duelist held the lance strapped between right leg and saddle. In fact, James Hardy theorized based on his quote from John Haldon and Romilly Jenkins, one of the decisive main factor for the Rashidun historical victory in battle of Yarmuk were due to their superb cavalry archers. While James Francis LePree has written that the factor of "unquestionably great cavalry skill of the Arabs' horse archers" during the battle of Yarmuk.

Cavalry archers also used to bait the opposing army from their position, which were reported by Tabari during the Battle of Nahavand, when Tulayha planned to lure the bulk of enemy forces by sending armoured cavalry archers forth and shooting them while retreating to bait them to the favorable terrain for Muslim army to fight the Sassanids.

==== Cavalry usage during siege warfare ====
The tactics used by Iyad ibn Ghanm in his Mesopotamian campaign were similar to those employed by the Muslims in Palestine, though in Iyad's case the contemporary accounts reveal his specific modus operandi, particularly in Raqqa. The operation to capture that city entailed positioning cavalry forces near its entrances, preventing its defenders and residents from leaving or rural refugees from entering. Concurrently, the remainder of Iyad's forces cleared the surrounding countryside of supplies and took captives. These dual tactics were employed in several other cities in al-Jazira. They proved effective in gaining surrenders from targeted cities running low on supplies and whose satellite villages were trapped by hostile troops.

Ubadah ibn al-Samit, another Rashidun commander, is also recorded to have developed his own distinct strategy which involved the use of cavalry during siege warfare. During a siege, Ubadah would dig a large hole, deep enough to hide a considerable number of horsemen near an enemy garrison, and hid his cavalry there during the night. When the sun rose and the enemy city opened their gates for the civilians in the morning, Ubadah and his hidden cavalry then emerged from the hole and stormed the gates as the unsuspecting enemy could not close the gate before Ubadah's horsemen entered. This strategy was used by Ubadah during the Siege of Laodicea and Siege of Alexandria.

== Mounts ==
The possession of horse among Arab peoples were long time traditionally considered as symbol of wealth and prestige. The musing of pure Arabian horse breed in Arab community social standing also found in the dialogue between caliph Umar with one of his cavalry commander, Amr ibn Ma'adi Yakrib, which recorded in the Al-ʿIqd al-Farīd anthology of adab authored by Ibn Abd Rabbih. According to Schiettecatte, Earliest osteological evidence for the horses in Arabia were found in Bahrain in a middle of the 1000 BC. The developments of early cavalry regiments within caliphate were effected due to the availability of the rich Meccan Arabs to field sufficient horses.

Notables among Arab Muslims, especially those of Companions of the Prophet, were recorded possessed multiple horses and camels privately, such as Khalid ibn al-Walid, who reportedly possessed at least 16 horses which all named. This practice of possessing multiple horses were not unlike Amr ibn Ma'adi Yakrib, the cavalry commander who had mythical reputation, also had at least four named horses of his own, which number grown further as later the governor of Basra rewarded Amr with foal pregnant mare with preserved pedigree from al-Ghabra type (dust colored type). Meanwhile, other warriors like Zubayr ibn al-Awwam owns a swooping number of 1,000 horses in his private stable. while on the other hand, Abd al-Rahman ibn Awf reportedly possessed hundreds of horses and 1,000 camels, and Dirar ibn al-Azwar, who also reportedly owns about 1,000 camels even before embracing Islam and pledge his allegiance to the Caliphate. (Note: Baghawi transmit the long narrative chains which came from Dhiraar himself which recorded by Al-Tabarani. however Ibn Hajar al-Asqalani rejected the authenticity of the dialogue contained in the narration, although he did not criticize regarding the case that Dhiraar's possession of thousand camels which came in the background of the dialogue narration)

=== Horses ===
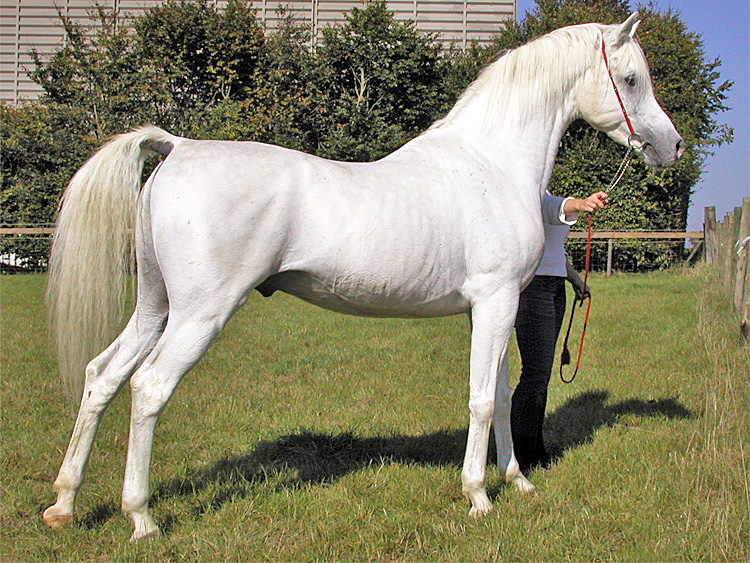
White Arabian horse

Caliphate Arabian noble cavalry (Note: The nobility of the Nomad Arabs were based on tribal militaristic meritocracy and genealogical (both their own and their horses') supremacy, according to Elizabeth E. Bacon) almost certainly rode the legendary purebred Arabian horse, by fact the quality breeding of horses were held so dearly by the early caliphates who integrated traditions of Islam with their military practice. The soldiers who possessed the pureblood Arabian horse even had the right to acquire bigger war spoils after battles than the soldiers who used other breeds or hybrid breed horses. The horses are culturally related with war in pre-Islamic Arabia as described in the long poems by Antarah ibn Shaddad and Durayd ibn al-Simma.

These horses are also pretty common breed amongst Arab community during 6th to 7th century. This special breed of steed were famous for their speed which allowed for large-scale conquests of the caliphate during their early days. The Arabian breed is forged by the harsh life in desert and raised by nomadic Bedouins who spread it throughout their travels, and erect it as a symbol of social and cultural status, in parallel with a martial selection. This breed are known as a hot-blooded breed that are known for their competitiveness. Long withstanding periods of Arabian nomadic society closeness with the horses also contributed to fertility of equestrian masters which produced best class horse breed in Arabia. The phenomenal speed, stamina, intelligence, along with very well documented pedigrees quality even for modern era standard, caused the Rashidun leaders to initiate a formal programs to distinguish them from inferior hybrids with unknown pedigrees including horses recently captured from the defeated enemies. Earlier attempts of Muslim horse-breeding were found in the aftermath of Siege series of Khaybar fotresses when the Muslims acquired massive booties of horses from the Jewish castles. In response Muhammad personally instructed the breeding separations between purebred Arabian and the hybrid-class steeds. in later cases, such tradition of glorifying the breed of pure Arabian steeds are recorded by caliphate soldiers during the conquest of Persia. While another detailed example were Zubayr ibn al-Awwam, who owned many horses. The most famous Arabian horse that owned and being named by az-Zubayr were al-Ya'sūb, which he ride in the Battle of Badr. al-Ya'sūb pedigree was preserved carefully by Zubayr's clansmens, the Banu Asad ibn Abd al-Uzza branch from Quraysh tribe, who create a system of "horse-clan", the "horse-clan" system of recording their horses ancestry and lineage are meant carefully maintain the horses genealogical purity and quality while also manage to keep the steeds genealogy traceable, as in al-Ya'sūb case, who belong to a horse-clan namely al-Asadi. the al-Asadi horse clan were keep by Zubayr for generations.

Al-Baihaqi transmitted in Shuab al-iman about "Birdhaun breed", or horse of poor breed that are hailing not Arabian breed, more specifically a Turkish horses breed, which caliph Umar warned his governors against riding such horses. According to Bayhaqi, prohibiting a breed considered second-rate makes it obvious that to ride horses of the best Arab breed would be even a greater sign of pride. The Arabian theory were justified in the medieval tradition as Mamluk Furusiyya treatises of hippiatry distinguished lineages of Arabian horses were named based on their geographical provenance (Hejaz, Najd, Yemen, Bilād al‑Shām, Jezirah, Iraq), the noblest breed, according to Ibn al‑Mundhir were the Hijazi breed.

The early caliphate army preferred mares than stallion as warhorses. Khalid ibn al-Walid were said preferred mare by reason it believed that the mares were more fit for cavalry combats. The specific explanation is that mares are not as vocal as either horses or geldings, and the Arabs often believed mares did not need to stop to urinate, which saves times of the army mobilization. Another reason for the Arabian cavalry to uniformly prefer mares during battles because bringing stallions during combat can potentially disrupt the riders rank as the mares in heat can incite stallions libido and caused the stallion difficult to control.

==== Mahranite cavalry ====
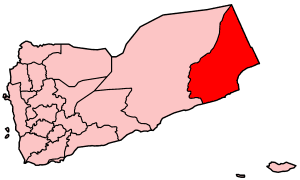
Map of contemporary Yemen showing Al Mahrah Governorate from where Mahri tribes hailed.

Caliphate cavalry recruited from Al-Mahra tribe were known for their military prowess and skilled horsemen that often won battles with minimal or no casualties at all, which Amr ibn al As in his own words praised them as "peoples who kill without being killed", (Note: The derived narrations from Amr ibn al As seems original text from him which preserved by Ibn Abd al-Hakam chains of narrator source)

Ibn Abd al-Hakam remarks their relative minimal casualties whenever engaged in military operations. Amr was amazed by these proud warriors for their ruthless fighting skill and efficiency During Muslim conquest where they spearheaded Muslim army during the Battle of Heliopolis, the Battle of Nikiou, and Siege of Alexandria. Their commanders, Abd al-Salam ibn Hubayra al-Mahri were entrusted by Amr ibn al-As to lead the entire Muslim army during the Arab conquest of north Africa. Abd al-Salam defeated the Byzantine army in Libya, and throughout these campaigns Al-Mahra were awarded much land in Africa as recognition of their bravery. When Amr established the town of Fustat, he further rewarded Al-Mahri members additional land in Fustat which then became known as Khittat Mahra or the Mahra quarter. This land was used by the Al-Mahra tribes as a garrison.

During the turmoil of Second Fitna, more than 600 Mahranites were sent to North Africa to fight Byzantines and the Berber Kharijite revolts.

=== Camels ===
Aside from horses, Rashidun cavalry used camels as their means of transportation as they want to save their horses energy, while outside the battle, the camels were used to transport the provisions of the soldiers, as each soldiers of the caliphate were expected to provide his own provisions at the very least outside the main army provided by the leaders or wealthy soldiers.

During the battle, the Rashidun cavalry immediately change their ride to the horses, while their camels are hobbled along the defensive perimeters of Muslim army. Their camels are used defensively during battle as the bulk of camel lines perimeter will blunt the enemy heavy cavalry charge Sometimes, these Arab cavaliers also recorded to ride their camels simultaneously with their horse in one battle depending on the situation, as recorded in the report about Muslim horsemen named Zubayr ibn al-Awwam, when he fought on the Battle of the Yarmuk, at one point he is reported charging with his horse, breaching the Byzantine army line. While in the same battle, he also reported has changed his ride to camel, while fighting defensively and praying at the same time.

Aside from carrying provisions, transportations, and for battle usage, the camel mares were valued for their milk production for the warhorses daily nourishments. The camels milk reserved as substitution for the Rashidun army horses drink whenever water supply unavailable. Two camel mares milk were expected to nourish one horse each day.

==== Emergency rations and Khalid legendary camels march ====
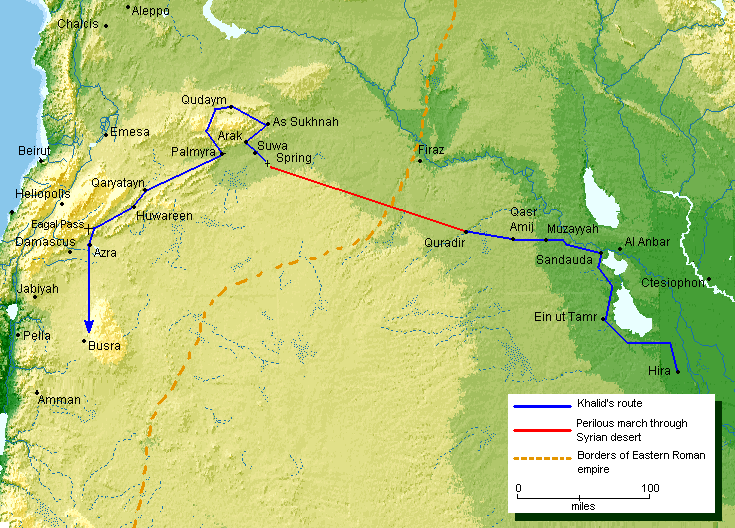
A map showing one of a series of possible itineraries of Khalid's march to Syria from Iraq

Desperate caravaners are known to have consumed camels' urine and to have slaughtered them when their resources were exhausted.

Around 634, after the clash at the Battle of Firaz against intercepting Byzantine forces, caliph Abu Bakr immediately instructed Khalid to reinforce the contingents of Abu Ubayda, Amr ibn al-As, Mu'awiya, and Yazid ibn Abi Sufyan which started to invade Syria. Khalid immediately started his nearly impossible journey with his elite forces after leaving Muthanna ibn Haritha as his deputy in Iraq and instructed his soldiers to make each camel drink as much as possible before they started the six-day nonstop march without resupply. (Note: Professor Ross Burns stated in his book, Damascus, A History, that the arduous march of Khalid from Iraq to Syria lasted eighteen days, not six days, as the other historians mentioned.) In the end, Khalid managed to reach Suwa spring and immediately defeated the Byzantine garrison in Arak, Syria, who were surprised by Khalid's force's sudden emergence from the desert.

According to Hugh Kennedy, historians across the ages assessed this daring journey with various expressions of amazement. Classical Muslim historians praised the marching force's perseverance as a miracle work of Allah, while most western modern historians regard this as solely the genius of Khalid. It is Khalid, whose, in Hugh Kennedy's opinion, imaginative thinking effected this legendary feat. The historian Moshe Gil calls the march "a feat which has no parallel" and a testament to "Khalid's qualities as an outstanding commander", while Laura Veccia Vaglieri dismissed the adventure of Khalid as never having happened as Vaglieri thought such journey were logically impossible. Nevertheless, military historian Richard G. Davis explained that Khalid imaginatively employed camel supply trains to make this journey possible. Those well hydrated camels that accompanied his journey were proven before in the Battle of Ullais for such a risky journey. Khalid resorted to slaughtering many camels for provisions for his desperate army.

Rashidun army camels also bore offspring while marching to the battle, as Tabari recorded the Rashidun vanguard commander Aqra' ibn Habis, testified before the Battle of al-Anbar, the camels belongs to his soldiers were about to give birth. However, since the Aqra' would not halt the operation, he instructed his soldiers to carry the newborn camels on the rumps of adult camels.

==== Mahranite camelier corps ====
Amr ibn al-As led a ruthless cavalry corps from tribes of Al-Mahra who were famous for their "invincible battle skills on top of their mounts", during the conquests of Egypt and north Africa (Note: The derived narrations from Amr ibn al As were attributed to the traditions of Ibn Abd al-Hakam chains of narrators). Al-Mahra tribes were experts in camelry and famed for their high-class Mehri camel breed which were renowned for their speed, agility and toughness.

=== Hima breeding ground ===
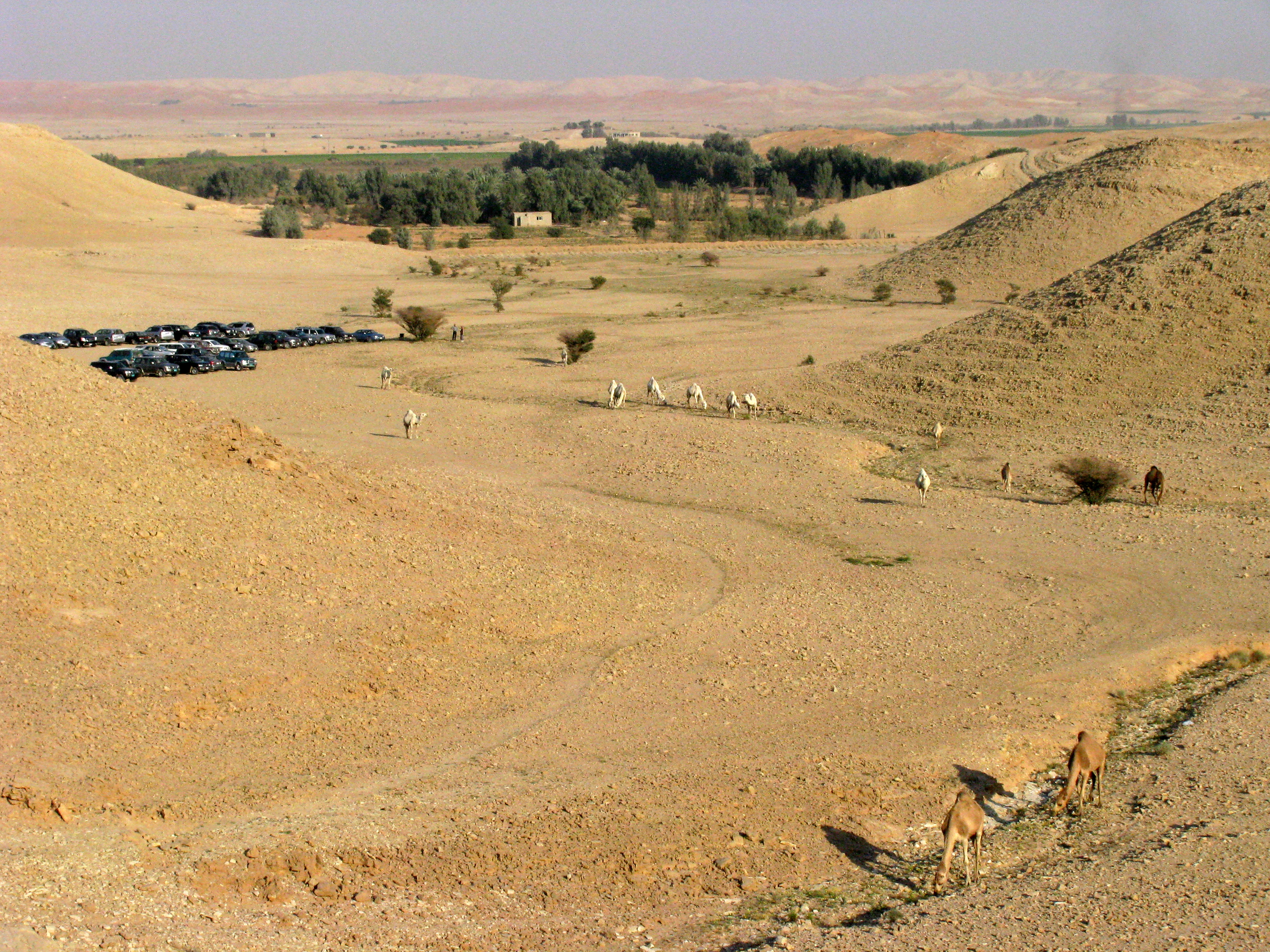
Arabian Camel herd grazing near the Riyadh River, southeast Diriyah

Hima natural reserve which instituted by the early leaders of Islam caliphate were one of the main factor for their army to be able to keep supplying mounts in large numbers. This breeding institution were formed by the caliphs Nejd, where the steppe vegetation apparent in Arabia. The Hima breeding fields were consisted of large area maintained the vegetative and the animals could lived and bred completely free, as no one are allowed to enter the Hima except the rightful owner of the animals which bred on there.

The history of Hima breeding grounds preservation as an effort to supply the army with mounts were rooted from the early Islam period, where Modern Islamic studies researchers theorized institution of Hima by caliph Umar, who inspired by the earliest Hima established in Medina during the time of Muhammad. Muhammad has declared the valley of Naqi (Wadi an-Naqi) to be reserved for the army mounts usage. Another known Hima breeding grounds during the caliphate were in Kufa, which supervised by Rabi' al Kinda, father in law of the son of Sa'd ibn Abi Waqqas, governor of Kufa during caliphate of Umar and Uthman. Muhammad himself instructed that some of private property at the outskirts of Medina was transformed into Hima. Banu Kilab tribe from Hawazin confederation were known to manage the Ḥima Ḍarīyya in Nejd.

Caliph Umar particularly ordered the extensive establishments of Hima in the conquered areas in Iraq and Levant after the Battle of the Yarmuk and the Battle of al-Qadisiyyahh, as the Rashidun caliphate gained large swath of territory after those two battles. Another reason the caliph Umar moved Hima from Medina was the increasing military demand for camels for which the lands near Medina no longer sufficed. According to classical Muslim sources, caliph Umar acquired some fertile land in Arabia which were deemed fit for large-scale camel breeding to be established as Hima, government-reserved land property used as pasture to raise camels that were being prepared to be sent to the front line for Jihad conquests. Early sources recorded that the Hima of Rabadha and Diriyah produced 4.000 war camels annually during the reign of Umar, while during the reign of Uthman, both Hima lands further expanded until al-Rabadha Hima alone could produce 4.000 war camels. At the time of Uthman's death, there were said to be around 1.000 war camels already prepared in al-Rabadhah.

The Hima breeding program of stockbreeding were soon adopted by the Ghassanids Arabs who supplied horses to the Byzantines. The Lakhmids Arabs in Iraq who used the Persian breed as their horses, also adopted the Hima system with success. The Hima breeding grounds in Nejd survived until the 20th century during the reign of the kingdom of Saudi Arabia government abolished those reserve places in 1957. The reason of the abolition were presumed by Shamekh as the effort of Saudi government to encourage sendentarization.

== Legacy ==
Modern historians and genealogists concluded that the stocks of early caliphate cavalry army that conquered from the western Maghreb of Africa, Spain to the east of Central Asia are drawn from the stock of fierce Bedouin pastoral nomads who take pride of their well-guarded mares genealogy, and called themselves the "People of the lance". (Note: "People of the lance" as quoted by Elizabeth E. Bacon) Thus, this caused many aspect of influences, whether the Animal breedings or another social and religious development within the territories they have conquered, Including Indian subcontinent.

=== Horsebreeding ===
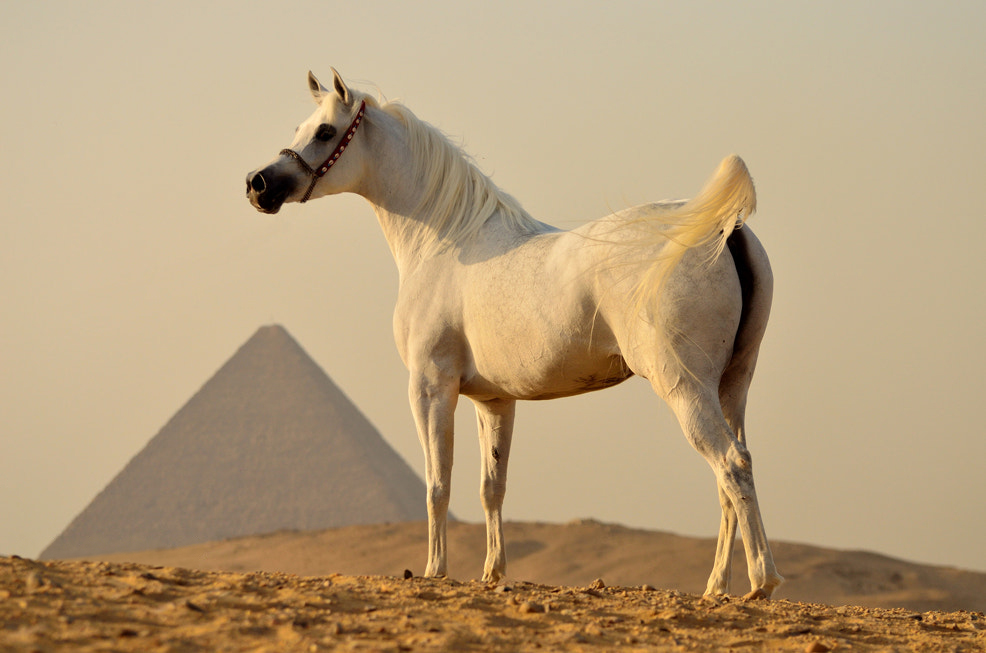
Gray Arabian mare in Egypt

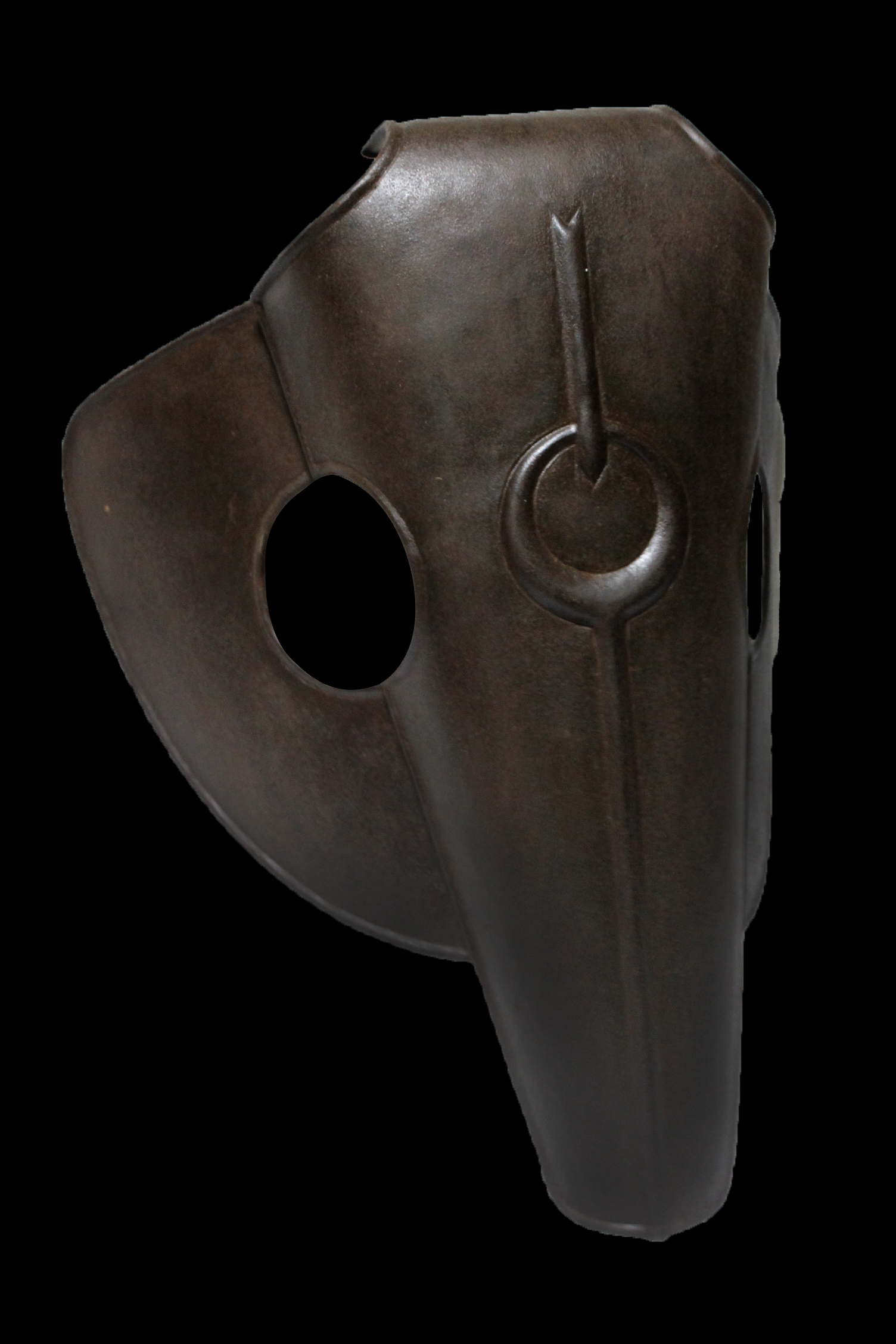
Mughal horse headgear, collection from Lamongan Museum, Indonesia

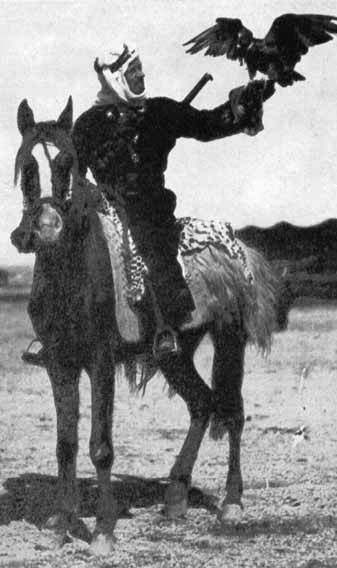
Carl Raswan riding Anazeh tribe horse

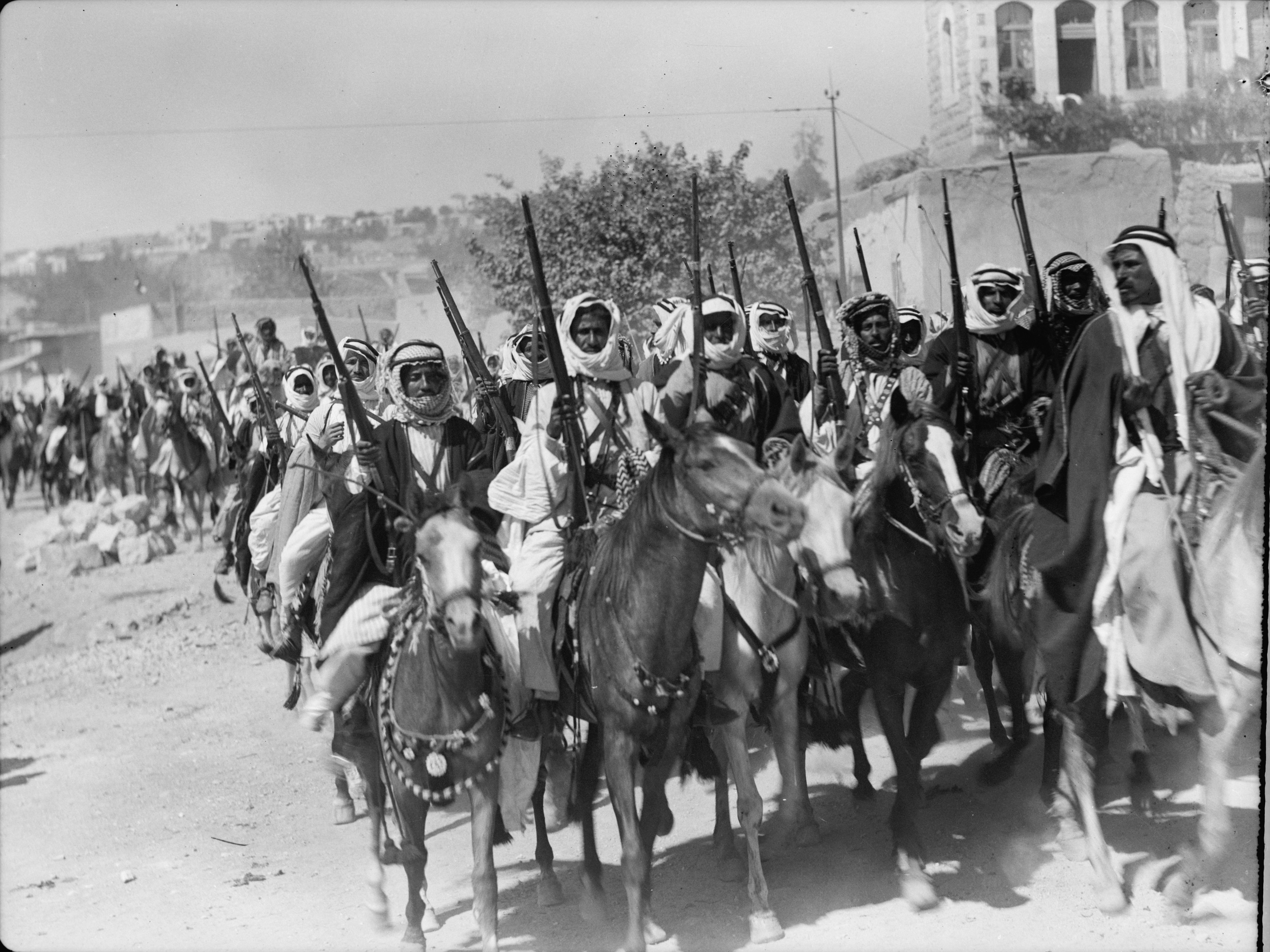
Amir Saud mounted army 18-19 AD

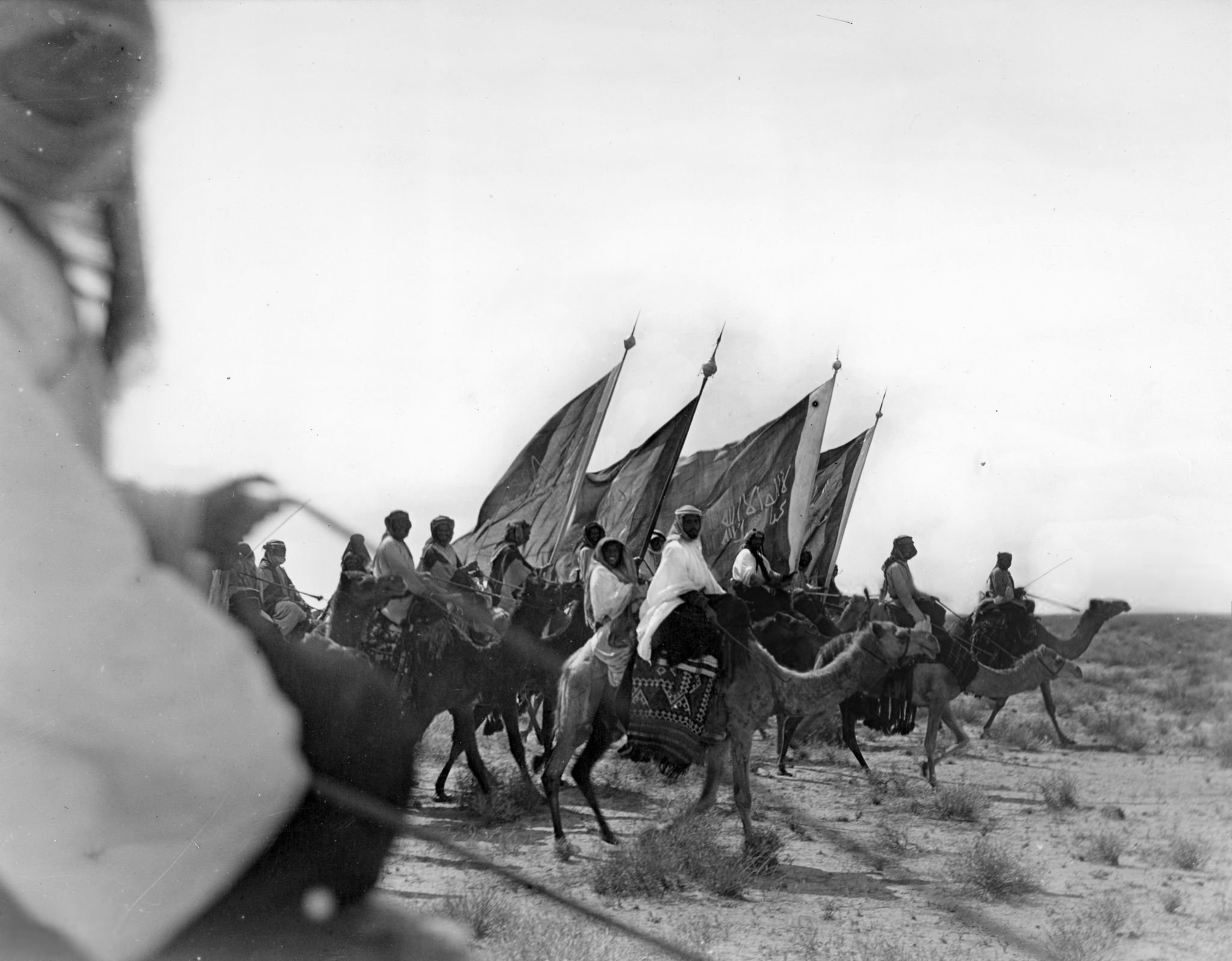
Ikhwan camel warriors during Saudi war

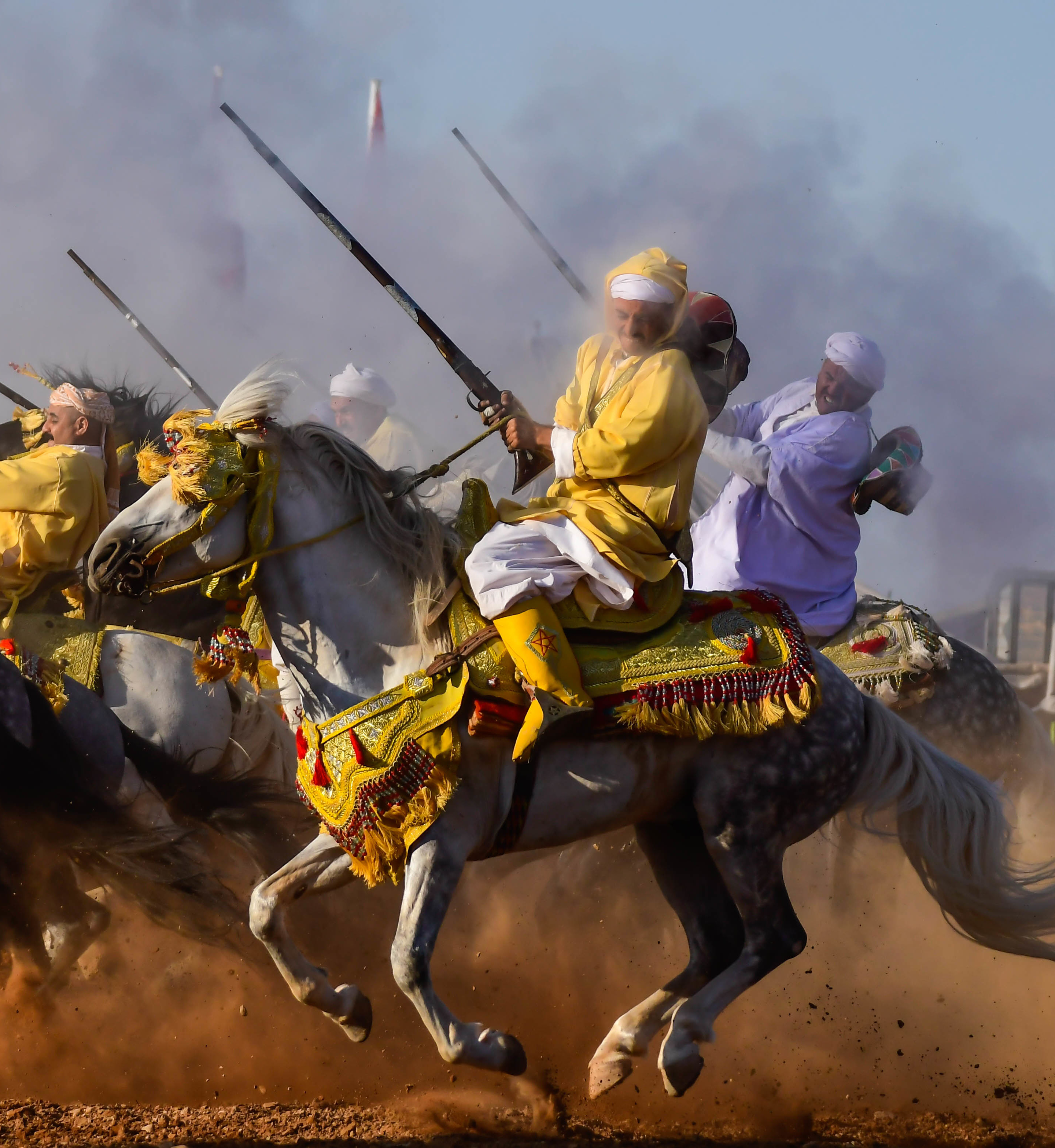
Barb horse "Fantasia" ridings in Morocco

The Mammals beast of burden brought by these desert warriors on horseback in massive scale unanimously agreed by historians and breeding researchers as bringing some degree of cultural influences towards their subjugated lands, whether it by the massive scale utilization of dromedaries, or their horses, as Muslim conquests of North Africa and the Iberian Peninsula brought large numbers of Arabian horses, The regular supply of horses from Hima breeding grounds has taken effect particularly after Muslim conquest of Persia, North Africa, and central Asia.

The Barb horse may have come with the Umayyad Caliphate army who settled in the Guadalquivir valley, as both the Arabian strain were brought by the Muslim empires to Europe, which implied by Margareth Greely, through military mean. The Barb horse spread theory were supported by Helen Goldstein who theorized about how the conqueror of Spain, Tariq ibn Ziyad brought the Barb horses along with the Arabian strain during the Muslim conquest of Iberia, as the Barb horses are favored for spare mounts by forces of Tariq as Goldstein theorized the Muslim invaders prized the Arabian breed so much, so they keep them most of the times, while they used the Barbs for trivial routines. The Barbs brought by them crossbreeded through ages with native Spanish horses. Barbs crossbreedings with Spanish stock under 300 years of Umayyad patronage has developed the Andalusian horse (and the Lusitano) breeds. Regarding the Portuguese claimed Lusitano breed, Juan Valera-Lemait noted the evidence of the exchange of blood between the Iberian breeds with Barb breeds were mutually beneficial, to the point that modern Barb more resembling the Iberian breed stock as well as the criollo horses of South America. while the introduction to America continent were related to the Muslim invasion medieval era, when Spain and Portugal were in constant war with the Berber invaders where horse and horsemanship had become finely attuned to the war exercises. Thus resulted the Conquistadors introduced and dispersed the breed throughout America.

Meanwhile, the genetics strength of the desert-bred Arabian horse, Arabian bloodlines have played a part in the development of nearly every modern light horse breed, including the Orlov Trotter, Morgan, American Saddlebred, American Quarter Horse, and Warmblood breeds such as the Trakehner. Arabian bloodlines have also influenced the development of the Welsh Pony, the Australian Stock Horse, Percheron draft horse, Appaloosa, and the Colorado Ranger Horse. In modern era, peoples cross Arabians with other breeds to add refinement, endurance, agility and beauty. In the US, Half-Arabians have their own registry within the Arabian Horse Association, which includes a special section for Anglo-Arabians (Arabian-Thoroughbred crosses). Some crosses originally registered only as Half-Arabians became popular enough to have their own breed registry, including the National Show Horse (an Arabian-Saddlebred cross), the Quarab (Arabian-Quarter Horse), the Pintabian the Welara (Arabian-Welsh Pony), and the Morab (Arabian-Morgan).

Another possible strain of horse that came to Europe with these Islamic cavalry invaders was the Turkoman horse, which was possibly brought from Muslim conquest of Transoxiana and Persia.

==== Mamluk horse ====
The successful Hima breeding programs of the early caliphates has effected an inexhaustable supply of manpower and warhorses, which extended to the Mamluk Sultanate 150 years of cavalry superiority before the advent of firearms.

Aside from practical military use, the breeding of pure Arabian stock was practiced by the military regime of Mamluk to gain social prestige in the middle of Arabian aristocratic society in Egypt, Sham, and Hejaz. Since the Mamluks hailed from slavery, which comprised Turkic peoples from the Eurasian Steppe, and also Circassians, Abkhazians, Georgians, Armenians, Albanians, Greeks, South Slavs (see Saqaliba) or Egyptians. The Mamluk thought that the genealogical purity of their steeds were symbols of martial horsery culture of Arabians, religious purity, and military might.

Arabian horses also spread to the rest of the world via the Ottoman Empire, which rose in 1299. This Turkish empire obtained many Arabian horses through trade, diplomacy and war. The Ottomans encouraged formation of private stud farms in order to ensure a supply of cavalry horses.

==== Delhi Sultanate and Mughal Empire ====
During the Umayyad campaigns in India, Muhammad ibn Qasim has brought cavalry of 6000 riding fine Arabian Horses. Since then, exports of horses via the maritime routes through the Persian Gulf, supplied mainly from Arabian peninsula and southern Iran has flowed through India. Since then, the Muslim regimes in India has undergoing extensive cavalry army building which revolved around the Arabian horse, such as Delhi Sultanate, and also the Mughal Empire, as it is attested further by the period of Mughal of the 16th to 17th century, when horses were imported from the countries of Arabia, Iran, Turkey and Central Asia to India.

the Bhimthadi horse, or Deccani horse breed, gets its name from the vast Deccan Plateau in India. A major trade in Arabian horse breeds in the ports of Deccan began after the Bahamani Sultanate revolted against the Delhi Sultanate. The Bhimthadi breed was developed in Pune district in 17th and 18th centuries during the Maratha rule by crossing Arabian and Turkic breeds with local ponies.

==== Rise of Saudi ====
Arabian horses were classified based on their geographical provenance by their bedouin masters, such as Hejaz, Najd, Yemen, Bilād al‑Shām, Jezirah, or Iraq breed as example.

The Najd breed were somehow found their prominence both in warfare and cultural heritage in accordance with the rise of their master's regime, House of Saud and Wahhabism religious movement which spanned from the time of Wahhabi War on early 18th AD century, towards the aftermath of World War I. During Unification of Saudi Arabia war, high ranked Arabian peninsula desert communities such as Sharif of Mecca and the first Saudi Emirate put emphasis on their Arabian horse breedings, in well documented records from Carl Raswan and other desert researchers.

In modern era, royal family from Kingdom of Saud also known for their love for breeding horses and spent expenses for such effort.

==== Islamic ruling regarding war horses breeds ====
The profound tradition of Arabian horse breeding exaltation by early caliphate soldiers even became a basis for scholars of later era. Muslim jurists who codified Islamic law from the mid‑eighth century to strongly connect the horse with Jihad, as They especially stated that it should receive shares in the plunder: two parts of the fourth‑fifths share by Maliki, Shafiʽi school and Hanbali, while one for Abū Ḥanīfa. Accordingl, there are belief in Islam about the Arabian horses which found in Hadith that an Arabian breeds were praying for their owners to God two times a day.

Shafi'i jurist, Al-Mawardi, to establish the ruling of regular military share that the owner of noble purebreed Arabian(al‑khayl al‑ʿitāq) should be rewarded a share of booty three times of regular infantry soldiers, while owners of inferior mixed breeds received only twice infantry soldiers' share. Al-Mawardi seems based his ruling from hadith tradition from companion of the prophet named Abd Allah ibn Amr ibn al-As. While Ahmad ibn Hanbal ruled that "a mixed‑breed birdhawn (al‑birdhawn al‑hajīn) should be given the half share of the noble Arabian [horse] (al‑ʿarabī al‑ʿatīq). Henceforth, the rider (fāris) of the birdhawn should be given two shares whereas the rider of the noble Arabian horse should be given three shares" The related tradition of cavalry spoils privilege from Miqdad ibn Aswad (Note: The hadith were included in record of Ibn Manzur record of Miqdad ibn Aswad biography in his book, brief history of Damascus) and Zubayr ibn al-Awwam privileged share of five times that of normal soldiers by the ruling that Zubayr were owner of warhorse and also a relative of Muhammad were discussed by modern Salafi scholars as valid rules based on those hadiths. (Note: Transmitted by Al-Daraqutni were observed and discussed by contemporary scholars of Islam particularly Salafist for the ruling from Umar were naturally relevant with Al-Anfal verse 41 "And know that anything you obtain of war booty - then indeed, for Allah is one fifth of it and for the Messenger and for [his] near relatives;"^{[Quran 8:41 (Translated by Saheeh International)]}, as the modern salafist borrowed the interpretation of the verse from Ibn Kathir and Al-Baghawi, that Zubayr privilege were valid as he still counted as blood relative of Muhammad through az-Zubayr mother, so aside from the three parts which usually given to cavalry, two more parts of spoils were given to Zubayr for his blood relation with the prophet.)

=== Military, religious and political legacy ===
During the Second Fitna, Najdat controlled Yamama in central Arabia, whereas Azariqa controlled Fars and Kirman in southern Persia.

Chroniclers recorded Kharijites as among fiercest and most zealous element within caliphate cavalry hailed from the Bedouin tribes of Arabs and Berbers, (Note: The egalitarian Kharijite doctrine brought by the Sufrite preachers were indeed also found homage to the flocks of Berber soldiers due to their largely unequal treatment under caliphate) that will later revolt against their own caliphate. 8th century chronicler, Al-Jahiz noted Kharijites horsemen ferocity, who spent parts of their early career in Kufa as Rashidun garrison troop during the Muslim conquest of Persia.

The Kharijites were feared for their powerful cavalry charge with their lances which could break any defensive line, and almost never lose when pitted against equal number of opponents. This claim also supported by Akbar Shah Khan Najibabadi, who has given measure that a valiant Kharijite army sometimes could even defeat an opponent whose number were ten times or twenty times bigger than them. The testament Kharijites prowess are when the Kharijites quietists faction (Note: These faction according to Akbar Shah were groups that living peacefully in the soils of Iran province, who became awake and active after the decline of Abdullah ibn Zubayr power and the provocation of the Umayyad propagandists in Iran against Abdullah ibn Zubayr.) led by Abu Bilal Mirdas, (Note: Abu Bilal Mirdas were known by Muslim historians during one of the sermon by Abdallah ibn Amir, Amir or governor of Iraq, Abu Bilal openly criticizing the governor for his garment: "Look at our Amir wearing clothes of wickedness!", this prompted So Abu Bakrah Muhammad ibn Bashar Bindar, a Tabi'un, angrily reprimand Abu Bilal by saying: "Be quiet! I heard the Messenger of Allah saying: "Whoever insults Allah's Sultan on the earth, Allah disgraces him.") who hailed from Tamim tribe decimated the 2,000 Umayyad force from Basra under Aslam ibn Zur'a al-Kilabi, with only forty men in the encounter at the village of Asak near Ramhurmuz.

Meanwhile, Al-Jahiz also pointed out Kharijites steeds' speed could not intercepted by most rival cavalrymen in medieval era, save for the Turkish Mamluks, As Tabari recorded the stamina and nimbleness of Kharijites, where they will even retreat long time, as it takes early morning until time for Salah prayer for Abu al-Rawwagh, caliphate commander, to pursue them without breaking down.

Furthermore, legendary perseverance of the Kharijites in history were recorded several times in the medieval chronicles, such as when Abd al-Rahman ibn Muljam, member of Kharijite assassin who murdered Ali, did not flinch in pain or shown fear when his arms, legs, and eyes mutilated by Ali sons, Hasan ibn Ali and Husayn ibn Ali, before being executed. Ibn Muljam only shown fear when it is his tongue are about cut, due to his reason that if his tongue were cut, he cannot pray with his mouth again before executed. or when the Ibadi Rustamid warriors under Abd al-Wahhab ibn Abd al-Rahman are said never flinched against hails of enemy arrows, and even laughed when arrows stuck on their bodies.

==== Hurqus and Iraqi Kharijites ====
According to Al-Shahrastani, an 11th AD century Shafiite scholar, the proto Kharijite group were called al-Muhakkima al-Ula. they were rooted in the Muslim warriors existed in the times of Muhammad. the al-Muhakkima al-Ula group were led by a figure named Dhu al-Khuwaishirah at-Tamimi, more famously known as Hurqus ibn Zuhayr as-Sa'di, a Tamimi tribe chieftain, veteran of the Battle of Hunayn and first generation Kharijites who protested the war spoils distribution. Hurqus were recorded being prophesied by a Hadith from Muhammad that he will revolt against Caliphate later.

At first, Hosts of Hurqus were among those who participated in the Muslim conquest of Persia led by Arfajah, Rashidun general who commands the army and navy in Iraq. During Conquest of Khuzestan, Hurqus defeated Hormuzan in 638 at Ahvaz (known as Hormizd-Ardashir in modern era) to subdue the city. However, later during the reign of Uthman, Hurqus was one of the ringleaders from Basra that conspired to assassinate Uthman. They are the soldiers of Ali during the battle of Siffin, who later rebelled towards the Caliphate of Ali and planned their rebellion in the village of Haruri. Despite being suppressed by Ali, remnants of Hurqus group of Muhakkima al-Ula or the Haruriyya proto-Kharijites has survived and would later influenced the splinter sects of Azariqa, Sufriyyah, Ibadiyyah, Yazidiyyah, Maimuniyyah, Ajaridah, al-Baihasiyyah, and the Najdat radical sects. (Note: Sunni Muslim scholars agreed that Yazidiyyah and Maimuniyyah were the most deviant among all Kharijite sects according to Islamic Iman doctrine, as they have further different concept of prophet in Islam and Qur'an. Thus, according to Prof. Dr. Muhammad Isa al-Hariri were the reasons the jurists and scholars of Islam to brand the Yazidiyyah and Maimuniyyah as true Kafir (Heretic in Islam)) These violent warrior sects would plague the entire history of Rashidun Caliphate, Umayyad, and Abbasid with endemic rebellions.

The host of Hurqus also contained another troublesome Kharijite embryos that also came to Iraq under Arfajah were the ones that hail from Bajila tribe, Notable seditionist warriors from this tribe were Abd Allah ibn Wahb al-Rasibi, who participated in the early conquests of Persia under Sa'd ibn Abi Waqqas. and later joined the hosts of Hurqus against caliphate of Ali in the battle of Nahrawan.

==== Scholars evaluations about Kharijites ====
According to Shafiite scholar Abdul Qahir ibn Thahir Bin Muhammad Al Baghdadi in his book of encyclopedia of astray sect within Islam, al-Farq bain al-Firaq, The Azariqa were the most strongest faction with biggest followers. They are the first target by Abd Allah ibn al-Zubayr to be suppressed, who sent Al-Muhallab ibn Abi Sufra for the operation. Despite their military strength and fanatical zealotry, the Azariq followers were superficially prone to disunity and Divide and rule strategy launched by Muhallab, who acknowledged of the shallowness of the Azariqa Jihad concept when faced by Muhallab own jurists, engaging some religious debate towards some of their key members of the Kharijites regarding the flaw of their Islamic practice and Jihad, thus enticed most of them to indirectly serving Muhallab by striking their own allies. This fatal flaw were, according to Akbar Shah Najibabadi, the reason why Muhallab never lose his battle against the fearsome Kharijites, while seven of Muhallab sons also shown exemplarly success during anti-Kharijite operations.

Dr. Adam Ali M.A.PhD. postulated that Al-Jahiz's assessment of the military quality of Kharijites are synonymous with the regular Arab cavalry in general term of speed and charging maneuver. In fact, ʿAbd al-Malik ibn Ḥabīb, a jurist and historian in the 9th century described the Berber Kharijites as a mirror match for the Caliphate army, as they are resembling the Arabic caliphate martial tradition, except for the loyalty to authority. Ibn Nujaym al-Hanafi, Hanafi scholar, outlined his evaluation about Kharijites: "... kharijites are a folk possessing strength and zealotry, who revolt against the government due to a self-styled interpretation. They believe that government is upon falsehood, disbelief or disobedience that necessitates it being fought against, and they declare lawful the blood and wealth of the Muslims...”.

Scholars of later such as Al-Dhahabi, Abu Dawud al-Sijistani Muhammad ibn al-Uthaymeen, and Majd ad-Dīn Ibn Athir era has observed the historical influence of Dhu al-Khuwaishirah Hurqus at-Tamimi and Abu Bilal Mirdas at-Tamimi on their commentary notes as a warning against the danger of Khawarij, even when they are just criticizing the superiors in public and not openly rebelled.

== See also ==
- Khalid ibn Walid
- Rashidun Caliphate army
- Early Caliphate navy
- Companion cavalry (elite cavalry of Alexander's Macedonian army)
- Muslim conquest of Syria

== Bibliography ==
- Abdul-jabbar, Suhaib (2013). The predicate objective of the combined ten books - Comprehensive (Arabic ed.). modern comprehensive library. p. 370.
- Abu Bakr, Muhammad ibn Ibrahim ibn al-Mundhir (1985). الأوسط في السنن والإجماع والقياس - ج 5 [mesial in Traditions, consensus, and analogy/al'awsat fi al sunan wa al Ijma wa al qias] (1 ed.). IslamKotob.
- Akram, A. I. (2006). The Sword of Allah: Khalid Bin Al-Waleed, His Life and Campaigns. Mr. Books. ISBN 9788174355218.
- Akram, A. I. (2017). SWORD OF ALLAH : Khalid Bin Al-Waleed His Life & Campaigns. Adam Publishers & Distributors. ISBN 978-81-7435-521-8.
- al-Mubarak, Malik Abdulazeez (1997). Warfare in early Islam (PhD). University of Glasgow. p. 18.
- Al-Rashid, Saad A. (1979). "Lights on the History and Archaeology of Al-Rabadhah (Locally Called Abu Salim)". Proceedings of the Seminar for Arabian Studies. 9: 88–101. ISSN 0308-8421. JSTOR 41223222.
- al-Rawas, Isam Ali Ahmad (1990). Early Islamic Oman (ca – 622/280-893) : a political history. Theses, Durham University (Doctoral).
- Ali, Adam (2018). "The Turks: The Medieval World's Most Martial People". Medievalists.net. Medievalists.
- Alofs, Eduard (2014-11-01). "Studies on Mounted Warfare in Asia I: Continuity and Change in Middle Eastern Warfare, c. ce 550–1350 – What Happened to the Horse Archer?". War in History. 21 (4): 423–444. doi:10.1177/0968344513517664. ISSN 0968-3445. JSTOR 26098617. S2CID 163010878.
- Alofs, Eduard (2015-01-01). "Studies on Mounted Warfare in Asia II: The Iranian Tradition – The Armoured Horse Archer in the Middle East, c. ce 550–1350". War in History. 22 (1): 4–27. doi:10.1177/0968344513518333. ISSN 0968-3445. JSTOR 26098221. S2CID 162976652.
- Bacon, Elizabeth E. (1954-04-01). "Types of Pastoral Nomadism in Central and Southwest Asia". Southwestern Journal of Anthropology. 10 (1): 44–68. doi:10.1086/soutjanth.10.1.3629075. ISSN 0038-4801. JSTOR 3629075. S2CID 155878499.
- Biladuri, Ahmad Bin Yahya Bin Jabir Al (2011-03-01). The Origins of the Islamic State: Being a Translation from the Arabic Accompanied With Annotations, Geographic and Historic Notes of the Kitab Futuh Al-buldan. Cosimo, Inc. ISBN 978-1-61640-534-2.
- bin Husain Abu Lauz, Abu Anas Ali (2004). "Fenomena Bom Bunuh Diri". Almanhaj. p. narrated by Al-Qurtubi. "[Disalin dari majalah As-Sunnah Edisi Khusus/Tahun VIII/1425H/2004M. Diterbitkan Yayasan Lajnah Istiqomah Surakarta, Jl. Solo – Purwodadi Km.8 Selokaton Gondangrejo Solo 57183 Telp. 0271-858197 Fax 0271-858196.Kontak Pemasaran 085290093792, 08121533647, 081575792961, Redaksi 08122589079]"
- Burns, Ross (2007-06-11). Damascus: A History. Routledge. ISBN 978-1-134-48849-0.
- Caskel, W. (1960). "'Amir b. Sa'sa'a". In Gibb, H. A. R.; Kramers, J. H.; Lévi-Provençal, E.; Schacht, J.; Lewis, B. & Pellat, Ch. (eds.). The Encyclopaedia of Islam, Second Edition. Volume I: A–B. Leiden: E. J. Brill. OCLC 495469456.
- Clarke, Nicola (2013). "'They are the most treacherous of people': religious difference in Arabic accounts of three early medieval Berber revolts" (PDF). EHumanista. 24: 510–525.
- Cosgrove, Elissa J.; Sadeghi, Raheleh; Schlamp, Florencia; Holl, Heather M.; Moradi-Shahrbabak, Mohammad; Miraei-Ashtiani, Seyed Reza; Abdalla, Salma; Shykind, Ben; Troedsson, Mats; Stefaniuk-Szmukier, Monika; Prabhu, Anil (2020-06-16). "Genome Diversity and the Origin of the Arabian Horse". Scientific Reports. 10 (1): 9702. Bibcode:2020NatSR..10.9702C. doi:10.1038/s41598-020-66232-1. ISSN 2045-2322. PMC 7298027. PMID 32546689.
- Davis, Richard G. (2010). U.S. Army and Irregular Warfare 1775-2007: Selected Papers From the 2007 Conference of Army Historians: Selected Papers From the 2007 Conference of Army Historians. Government Printing Office. p. 23. ISBN 978-0160867309.
- De Slane, Bn. Mac Guckin (1868). Ibn Khallikan's Biographical Dictionary Translated from the Arabic by Bn. Mac Guckin De Slane: Paris Oriental Translation Fund of Great Britain and Northern Ireland, 1868. Biblioteca Provinciale.
- Donner, Fred M. (2014-07-14). The Early Islamic Conquests. Princeton University Press. ISBN 978-1-4008-4787-7.
- Faizer, Rizwi (2013). The Life of Muhammad Al-Waqidi's Kitab Al-Maghazi. Taylor & Francis. p. 349. ISBN 9781136921148.
- Ghadanfar, Mahmood Ahmad (2001). The Commanders of Muslim Army. Darussalam.
- Gil, Moshe (1997) [1983]. A History of Palestine, 634–1099. Translated by Ethel Broido. Cambridge: Cambridge University Press. ISBN 0-521-59984-9.
- Greene, Joseph A.; Stager, Lawrence E.; Coogan, Michael D. (2018). The Archaeology of Jordan and Beyond Essays in Memory of James A. Sauer. Brill. ISBN 9789004369801.
- Hathaway, Jane (2003). A Tale of Two Factions: Myth, Memory, and Identity in Ottoman Egypt and Yemen. State University of New York Press.
- Hendrickx, Benjamin (2012). "THE BORDER TROOPS OF THE ROMAN-BYZANTINE SOUTHERN EGYPTIAN LIMES: PROBLEMS AND REMARKS ON THE ROLE OF THE AFRICAN AND 'BLACK' AFRICAN MILITARY UNITS". Ekklesiastikos Pharos. 94. hdl:10520/EJC128657.
- Hinds, Martin (1996). Studies in Early Islamic History. Darwin Press. ISBN 978-0-87850-109-0.
- Howard, I. K. A., ed. (1990). The History of al-Ṭabarī, Volume XIX: The Caliphate of Yazīd ibn Muʿāwiyah, A.D. 680–683/A.H. 60–64. SUNY Series in Near Eastern Studies. Albany, New York: State University of New York Press. ISBN 978-0-7914-0040-1.
- al Hussein, Alia bint; Culbertson, Cynthia (2010). The Arabian Horse of Egypt. American University in Cairo Press. ISBN 978-977-416-348-7.
- Hutton, Richard Holt; Bagehot, Walter (1858). National Review. Robert Theobold.
- Hyland, Ann (1994). The Medieval Warhorse: From Byzantium to the Crusades. Grange Books. ISBN 978-1-85627-990-1.
- Ibn Abd al-Hakam, Abu'l Qāsim ʿAbd ar-Raḥman bin ʿAbdullah (1922). The history of the conquest of Egypt, North Africa and Spain : known as Fut Mir of. University of Toronto (Charles Torey ed.). Yale University Press.
- Ibn Hisham, Abu Muhammad 'Abd al-Malik bin Hisham ibn Ayyub (2019-10-01). Sirah Nabawiyah-Ibnu Hisyam (in Indonesian). Qisthi Press.
- Ibn Jarir at-Tabari, Muhammad; G. Morony, Michael (2015). The History of Al-Tabari Vol. 18 Between Civil Wars: The Caliphate of Mu'awiyah A.D. 661-680/A.H. 40-60 (9781438413600). SUNY press. ISBN 9781438413600.
- Ibn al-Kalbi, Hisham (2003). كتاب أنساب الخيل في الجاهلية والإسلام وأخبارها [The Book of Horse Genealogy in the Pre-Islamic Age and its News]. المكتبة الشاملة الحديثة.
- Idllalène, Samira (2021). Rediscovery and Revival in Islamic Environmental Law: Back to the Future of Nature's Trust. Cambridge University Press. ISBN 978-1-108-48878-5.
- Irham Zuhdi, Masturi; Abidun, M. (2015). Ensiklopedi Aliran dan Madzhab Di Dunia Islam [Encyclopedia of sects and Schools in the Islamic World; Arabic:Silsilah al-mawsu'at islamiyahmutakhasshihah; mausu'ah al-firad wa al-madzhahib fi al-alam al-islam] (in Indonesian). Pustaka al Kautsar; Tim Riset Majelis Tinggi Urusan Islam Mesir (Egyptian Islamic Affairs High Council Research Team). pp. 399–423. ISBN 978979-5926948. Archived from the original on 8 December 2021.
- J. T. Brown, William (1963). Kharijite Political Influences in Medieval Berbery. University of Wisconsin--Madison. pp. 11–16.
- Jalalipour, Saeid (2014). The Arab Conquest of Persia: The Khūzistān Province before and after the Muslims Triumph (PDF). Sasanika.
- Kennedy, Hugh N. (2008). The Great Arab Conquests: Penaklukan Terbesar dalam Sejarah Islam yang Mengubah Dunia (in Indonesian). Pustaka Alvabet. ISBN 978-979-3064-66-6.
- Kennedy, Hugh (2013-06-17). The Armies of the Caliphs: Military and Society in the Early Islamic State. Routledge. ISBN 978-1-134-53113-4.
- Kennedy, Hugh (2011). "The Feeding of the five Hundred Thousand: Cities and Agriculture in Early Islamic Mesopotamia". IRAQ. 73: 177–199. doi:10.1017/S0021088900000152. ISSN 0021-0889. JSTOR 23350021. S2CID 128901895.
- Kenney, Jeffrey T. (2006-10-12). Muslim Rebels: Kharijites and the Politics of Extremism in Egypt. Oxford University Press, USA. ISBN 978-0-19-513169-7.
- Krenkow, F. (1993) [1927]. "Kilāb b. Rabīʿa". The Encyclopædia of Islam: A Dictionary of the Geography, Ethnography and Biography of the Muhammadan Peoples, Volume IV: ʿItk-Kwaṭṭa (Reprint ed.). Leiden, New York and Koln: Brill. p. 1005. ISBN 9004082654.
- Kucera, Filip (2013). "Arab Horse in the Culture of Orient". Sensus Historiae. S2CID 192968105.
- Khazanov, Anatoly M.; Wink, Andre (2012-10-12). Nomads in the Sedentary World. Routledge. ISBN 978-1-136-12194-4.
- Al-Khudair, Abdul Karim bin Abdullah (2015). "الشمائل النبوية (17)" [Prophetic merits (17)]. Sheykh-el-Khudeyr. Department of Sunnah and its Sciences, Faculty of Theology, Imam Muhammad bin Saud University in Riyadh.
- Kremer, Alfred von; Bukhsh, Salahuddin Khuda (2000). Contributions to the History of Islamic Civilization. Kitab Bhavan. ISBN 978-81-7151-300-0.
- Levi Della Vida, G. (1993). "Mirdās b. Udayya". In Bosworth, C. E.; van Donzel, E.; Heinrichs, W. P. & Pellat, Ch. (eds.). The Encyclopaedia of Islam, Second Edition. Volume VII: Mif–Naz. Leiden: E. J. Brill. pp. 123–124. ISBN 978-90-04-09419-2.
- Lewis, Bernard (1970). "On the Revolutions in Early Islam". Studia Islamica (32): 215–231. doi:10.2307/1595221. ISSN 0585-5292. JSTOR 1595221.
- Lewis, Bernard (1995). The Middle East: A Brief History of the Last 2,000 Years. Simon and Schuster. ISBN 978-0-684-80712-6.
- Lydon, Ghislaine (2009-03-02). On Trans-Saharan Trails: Islamic Law, Trade Networks, and Cross-Cultural Exchange in Nineteenth-Century Western Africa. Cambridge University Press. ISBN 978-0-521-88724-3.
- Masih, Khalifatul (2019). "Men of Excellence friday sermon; quoting Al-Tabaqaat-ul-Kubra li ibn Sa'd, Vol. 3, p. 86, Dar-e-Ihyaa Al-Turath, Beirut, Lebanon, 1996; Dalail-ul-Nabuwwat Li Al-Behqi, Vol. 3, p. 39, Dar-ul-Kutub Al-Ilmiyyah, Beirut, Lebanon, 2002; (Al-Sirat al-Nabawiyyah li Ibn Hisham, p. 452, Dar-ul-Kutub al-Ilmiyyah, Beirut, Lebanon, 2001". al Hakam. Al Fazl International.
- Mayer, L. A. (1943). "Saracenic Arms and Armor". Ars Islamica. 10: 1–12. ISSN 1939-6406. JSTOR 4515613.
- Mohammed, M. Dr Etimad Jassim (2019). "Weapons and war tools in Umayyad poetry". Research and Islamic Studies Journal (57).
- Morony, Michael G., ed. (1987). The History of al-Ṭabarī, Volume XVIII: Between Civil Wars: The Caliphate of Muʿāwiyah, 661–680 A.D./A.H. 40–60. SUNY Series in Near Eastern Studies. Albany, New York: State University of New York Press. ISBN 978-0-87395-933-9.
- Mubarakpuri, Saifur Rahman Al (2005), The sealed nectar: biography of the Noble Prophet, Darussalam Publications, p. 246, ISBN 978-9960-899-55-8
- Nafziger, George F.; Walton, Mark W. (2003). Islam at War: A History. Greenwood Publishing Group. ISBN 978-0-275-98101-3.
- Nicolle, David (2017-03-02). "Horse Armour in the Medieval Islamic Middle East". Arabian Humanities. Revue internationale d'archéologie et de sciences sociales sur la péninsule Arabique/International Journal of Archaeology and Social Sciences in the Arabian Peninsula. 8 (8). doi:10.4000/cy.3293. ISSN 1248-0568.
- Norris, H. T. (1986). "THE FUTŪḤ AL-BAHNASĀ: And its relation to pseudo-"Maġāzī" and "Futūḥ" literature, Arabic "Siyar" and Western Chanson de Geste in the Middle Ages". Quaderni di Studi Arabi. 4: 76–78. JSTOR 25802579.
- Ogden, Jack (2018-05-08). "2. The Ancient World". Diamonds. Yale University Press. pp. 21–42. doi:10.12987/9780300235517-003. ISBN 978-0-300-23551-7. S2CID 246089487.
- Olsen, Sandra; Khan, Majeed; Bryant, Richard T.; Beard, Chris (2020). "Bi'r Hima". Arabian Rock Art Heritage The Application of Advanced Imaging Technology to Saudi Arabian Rock Art. The Arabian Rock Art Heritage Project.
- Petersen, Leif Inge Ree (2013). Siege Warfare and Military Organization in the Successor States (400-800 AD): Byzantium, the West and Islam. Brill. ISBN 978-90-04-25199-1.
- Q. Ahmed, Asad (2011). The Religious Elite of the Early Islamic Ḥijāz: Five Prosopographical Case Studies (Illustrated ed.). Occasional Publications UPR. ISBN 978-1900934138.
- Safiuz Zaman, M. S. (2015). "Honourable Mention: Yarmouk – The Necessity of Studying the Battle in Early Medieval Military Historiography". Journal of Military and Strategic Studies. 16 (2).
- Schiettecatte, Jérémie; Zouache, Abbès (2017-03-02). "The Horse in Arabia and the Arabian Horse: Origins, Myths and Realities". Arabian Humanities. Revue internationale d'archéologie et de sciences sociales sur la péninsule Arabique/International Journal of Archaeology and Social Sciences in the Arabian Peninsula. 8 (8). doi:10.4000/cy.3280. ISSN 1248-0568.
- Shahîd, Irfan (1995). Byzantium and the Arabs in the Sixth Century. Dumbarton Oaks. ISBN 978-0-88402-214-5.
- Shahîd, Irfan (2002). Byzantium and the Arabs in the Sixth Century, Part 1. Washington, D.C.: Dumbarton Oaks Research Library and Collection. ISBN 0-88402-284-6.
- Stepanov, Ivan S.; Weeks, Lloyd; Franke, Kristina A.; Overlaet, Bruno; Alard, Olivier; Cable, Charlotte M.; Al Aali, Yaaqoub Yousif; Boraik, Mansour; Zein, Hassan; Grave, Peter (2020-08-01). "The provenance of early Iron Age ferrous remains from southeastern Arabia". Journal of Archaeological Science. 120 105192. Bibcode:2020JArSc.120j5192S. doi:10.1016/j.jas.2020.105192. ISSN 0305-4403. S2CID 214006798.
- Subani, Hamad (2013). The Secret History of Iran. Lulu.com. ISBN 978-1-304-08289-3.
- Tabari, Muhammad ibn Jarir (1992). The History of al-Tabari Vol. 12: The Battle of al-Qadisiyyah and the Conquest of Syria and Palestine A.D. 635-637/A.H. 14-15. Bibliotheca persica. Vol. 12 (Yohanan Friedmann ed.). State University of New York Press. ISBN 9780791407332. LCCN 87150411.
- Tabari, Muhammad ibn Jarir (2015-06-16). The History of al-Tabari Vol. 14: The Conquest of Iran A.D. 641-643/A.H. 21-23. Translated by Smith, G. Rex. SUNY Press. ISBN 978-1-4384-2039-4.
- Timani, Hussam S. (2008). Modern Intellectual Readings of the Kharijites. Peter Lang. ISBN 978-0-8204-9701-3.
- Ulrich, Brian John (2008). Constructing Al-Azd: Tribal Identity and Society in the Early Islamic Centuries. University of Wisconsin--Madison.
- Upton, Peter (2006). Amirsdehgi, Hossein (ed.). Arabians. Photographs by Rik Van Lent, Jr., Rik Van Lent, Sr. Chronicle Books. ISBN 978-0-8118-5401-6.
- Vaglieri, L. Veccia (1965). "Dūmat al-Djandal". In Lewis, B.; Pellat, Ch. & Schacht, J. (eds.). The Encyclopaedia of Islam, Second Edition. Volume II: C–G. Leiden: E. J. Brill. pp. 624–626. OCLC 495469475.
- Walker, C.T. Harley (1917). "Jahiz of Basra to Al-Fath Ibn Khaqan on the "Exploits of the Turks and the Army of the Khalifate in General"". The Journal of the Royal Asiatic Society of Great Britain and Ireland: 631–697. JSTOR 25189369.
- Wellhausen, Julius (1901). Die religios-politischen Oppositionspartein im alten Islam (in German). OCLC 453206240.
- Wellhausen, Julius (1927). The Arab Kingdom and its Fall. Translated by Margaret Graham Weir. Beirut: Khayats.
