= Battle of Marj al-Dibaj =

634 CE conflict between the Rashidun Caliphate and Byzantine Empire

- Part of the Muslim conquest of Syria (Arab–Byzantine wars)
Date	September 634 A.D
Location	Jabal Ansariya, Syria
Result	Rashidun victory

Belligerents
Rashidun Caliphate	Byzantine Empire

Commanders and leaders
Khalid ibn al-Walid	Thomas †

Strength
4,000 cavalry	Estimated about 10,000 (Note: Survivors from the conquest of Damascus.)

Casualties and losses
Minimal	Heavy

The Battle of Marj al-Dibaj (Arabic: معركة مرج الديباج, romanized: Maʿrakat Marj Dābiq) was fought between the Byzantine army, survivors from the conquest of Damascus, and the Rashidun Caliphate army in September 634. It was a successful raid after three days of armistice, on the Byzantine survivors of the conquest of Damascus.

== Background ==
Damascus was conquered by the Rashidun army after a siege lasting about one month, from 21 August to 19 September 634 A.D. It was the first stronghold of the Byzantine Empire conquered by Muslims during the Muslim conquest of Syria. The Byzantine commander Thomas, commander in chief and governor of Damascus and son in law of Emperor Heraclius, after hearing that Muslim troops had entered Damascus at the Eastern gate, wisely tricked the Muslim corps commanders at the other gates by suing for peace. The peace offer then was accepted by them. After the trick was unveiled the Muslim commanders advised Khalid ibn al-Walid that the peace agreement should be kept, because if the Romans in Syria heard that the Muslims had given a guarantee of safety and then slaughtered those whose safety had been guaranteed, no other city would ever surrender to the Muslims, and that would make the task of conquering Syria immeasurably more difficult. Khalid was not happy, but he agreed. A Greek Muslim named Jonah suggested Khalid chase the Byzantines after the three days of armistice agreed upon was over. He gave his services to guide Khalid through a short cut route to reach them as soon as possible. According to Muslim chronicles this Greek man Jonah was in love with a girl who was his fiancée and was to be married to him but when the Muslim army launched the siege of the city, the marriage was postponed until peace was restored. Frustrated with the 13-month siege and delayed marriage Jonah came to Khalid and informed him about a weak post on the Wall of Damascus where that night security was to be weak. Khalid with other Muslim warriors climbed up the wall and opened the gates and the Muslim army positioned at the Eastern gate entered the city. Jonah's fiancée on hearing of his conversion to Islam broke the engagement and decided to move with the Byzantines to Antioch. This prompted Jonah once again to go to Khalid. The plan of Jonah was accepted by Khalid: they would launch a pursuit after three days, when the three days grace period was over. The Mobile Guard would dash out in pursuit and go at breakneck speed. On Jonah's suggestion it was decided that all would be dressed like local Arabs, so that any Roman units encountered on the way would mistake them for such and not intercept their movement.

== Battle ==
The route taken by the Mobile guard is not recorded. It is stated by the historian Al-Waqidi that the Muslims caught up with the convoy a short distance from Antioch, not far from the Mediterranean Sea, on a plateau beyond a range of hills called Jabal Ansariya, in Northern Syria.

Maneuver of Muslim army (in red) against the Byzantine convoy (in blue).

Due to a heavy downpour, the Byzantine convoy had dispersed on the plateau, seeking shelter from the weather, while their goods lay all over the place. So many bundles of brocade lay scattered on the ground that this plain became known as Marj-ud-Debaj, i.e. the Meadow of Brocade, and for this reason the action described has been named the Battle of Marj-ud-Debaj, or the Battle of Meadow of Brocade. Jonah and other scouts established the location of the convoy without being spotted and they brought back sufficient information for Khalid to plan his attack. Khalid arranged a plan of attacking the Byzantines from four different sides. First a cavalry regiment of 1000 warriors would attack the Byzantines from their rear in the south, subsequently followed by an attack of a cavalry regiment of 1000 warriors from the east, north (thereby blocking their retreat to Antioch) and finally from the west to encircle them completely.

It all happened as Khalid had planned. The Byzantines received their first indication of the presence of the Muslim army when a regiment of 1000 cavalry came charging at them from the south, along the road from Damascus, led by the Dirar ibn al-Azwar. Half an hour later another cavalry regiment of 1,000 warriors led by Rafi bin Umayr, appeared from the east and struck the Byzantines' right flank. Within the span of half an hour another cavalry regiment of 1,000 warriors led by Abd al-Rahman ibn Abi Bakr from the north, struck the Byzantines at the rear thus blocking their way to retreat north towards Antioch. After about another half an hour later the final Muslim cavalry of 1,000 warriors led by Khalid ibn al-Walid appeared from the west and attacked the Byzantines' left flank. Now the Byzantines were encircled by the Muslims' cavalry. Khalid personally killed Thomas (the son-in-law of Emperor Heraclius) (Note: According to Edward Gibbon: "Vanity prompted the Arabs to believe, that Thomas was the son-in-law of the emperor. We know the children of Heraclius by his two wives: and his august daughter would not have married in exile at Damascus (see du Cange, Historia Byzantina Familiae Byzantinae. p. 118–119.) Had he been less religious, I might only suspect the legitimacy of the damsel.") in a duel. After further fighting, Roman resistance collapsed. Since the Muslims were too few to completely surround the Byzantine army and the fighting had become confused as it increased in violence, thousands of Byzantines were able to escape and make their way to safety. But all the booty and a large number of captives, both male and female, fell to the Muslims. According to a chronicle Jonah found his beloved. He moved towards her to take her by force; but she drew a dagger from the folds of her dress and killed herself. As she lay dying, Jonah sat beside her and swore that he would remain true to the memory of the bride he was not destined to possess, and would not look at another girl. When Khalid learned of this he offered Jonah the daughter of Emperor Heraclius, the former wife of Thomas who died in the battle that day in a duel with Khalid. Jonah rejected the proposal. Jonah died a few years later in the Battle of the Yarmuk.

== Aftermath ==
The historian Al-Waqidi writes that on their way back to Damascus, Emperor Heraclius sent an ambassador to ask Khalid to return his daughter. (Note: According to Edward Gibbon: "Vanity prompted the Arabs to believe, that Thomas was the son-in-law of the emperor. We know the children of Heraclius by his two wives: and his august daughter would not have married in exile at Damascus (see du Cange, Historia Byzantina Familiae Byzantinae. p. 118–119.) Had he been less religious, I might only suspect the legitimacy of the damsel.") The ambassador gave Khalid the letter from the Emperor which read as follows:

'I have come to know what you have done to my army. You have killed my son-in-law and captured my daughter. You have won and got away safely. I now ask you for my daughter. Either return her to me on payment of ransom or give her to me as a gift, for honour is a strong element in your character.

Khalid said to the ambassador:

Take her as a gift, there shall be no ransom.

The ambassador took the daughter of Heraclius, and returned to Antioch. The return of the Mobile Guard loaded with spoils was greeted with joy by the Muslims at Damascus. The whole operation from pursuit to the return of the Mobile guard had taken 10 days. They returned on October 1, 634. Upon his return Khalid was informed of the death of Caliph Abu Bakr and the succession of Umar as the new caliph. Umar deposed Khalid from his command and appointed Abu Ubayda ibn al-Jarrah as the new commander in chief.
