= Battle of Firaz =

Part of the early Muslim conquests (633–634)

- Part of the Muslim conquest of Persia, Arab–Byzantine wars, early Muslim conquests
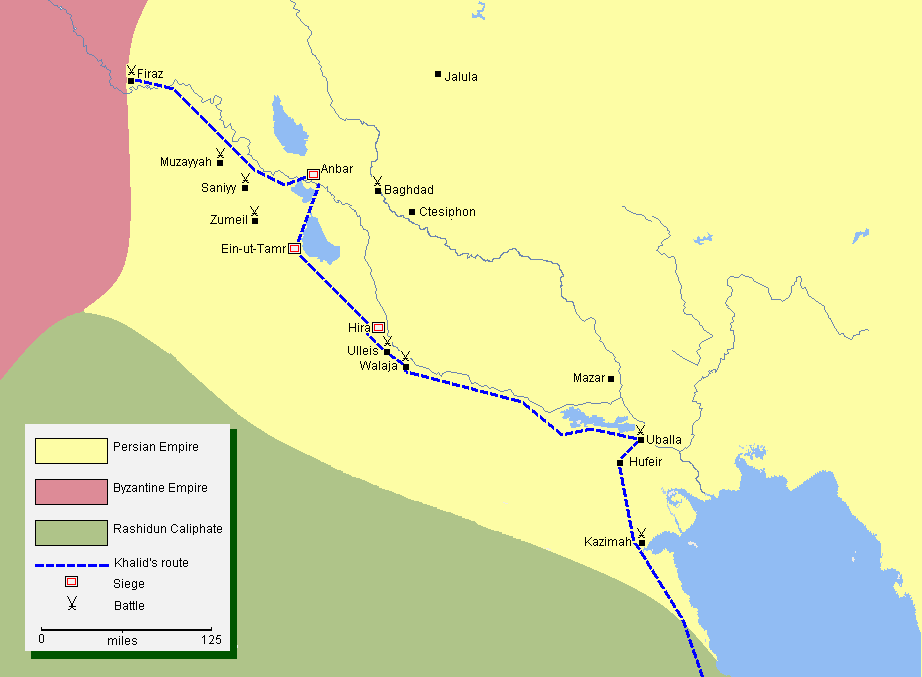
| Date | c. January 634 |
| Location | Firaz, Sasanian Empire (Sasanian–Byzantine border) |
| Result | Disputed (see § Views of historians) |

Belligerents
| Rashidun Caliphate | Byzantine Empire; Sasanian Empire (participation disputed) |

Commanders and leaders
| Khalid ibn al-Walid | Hormozd Jadhuyih (participation disputed) |

Strength
| 500–800 men (modern estimates) | Unknown, possibly slightly more (modern estimates) |

The Battle of Firaz (Arabic: مَعْرَكَة الْفِرَاض) also known as Battle of Firad, took place around January 634 between the Rashidun Caliphate and, reportedly, a combined force from the Byzantine Empire and Sasanian Empire.

== Background ==
By the end of 633, the Muslims were the masters of the Euphrates valley. In this valley, Firaz at the outermost edge of the Persian Empire still had a Persian garrison. Khalid decided to drive away the Persians from this outpost as well fearing that the Persians would execute a well planned re-invasion of lost territory. He marched to Firaz with a Muslim force and arrived there in the first week of December 633. Firaz was the frontier between the empires of Persia and Byzantium, and the garrisons of the Persians as well as the Byzantines were cantoned there. In the face of the Muslims, the Byzantine garrison decided to come to the aid of the Persian garrison.

== Engagement ==
Khalid gave the enemy the option to cross the Euphrates. As soon as the enemy had crossed the Euphrates, Khalid commanded the Muslim force to go into action. The united forces of the Persians and the Byzantines had the river at their back. At Firaz, Khalid adopted the same tactics as he had adopted at Mazar. As the front ranks of both the forces committed themselves in the fighting, Khalid fixed his enemy on either flank with the help of his rear wings. Making a swift movement, the Muslims dashed for the bridge on the river, and succeeded in occupying it. The enemy was thus held in a pincer movement.

== Views of historians ==
Sir William Muir noted that the casualties of the coalition army "must have been great, for tradition places it at the fabulous number of a hundred thousand" as the remaining fleeing soldiers were pursued and cut down by the cavalry of Rashidun.

According to Peter Crawford, Heraclius could not have provided a garrison along the Euphrates of such a scale so that the opposition against Khalid in Firaz numbered tenfold against the Arab force and it is possible the Byzantines at that point would have still seen the Arab incursion as a mere raid against Persian land. According to Michael Morony, professor of history at UCLA, Khalid won the battle.

Konstantinos Takirtakoglou, professor of Byzantine history believes that, firstly, a very limited contingent of the Sassanids and their allies participated in the battle, most likely their survivors of the defeats before last and retreated to the safety of the Byzantine fortress, against which Khalid went on the orders of the caliph to march to Syria, but was defeated and forced to undertake a dangerous trek through the desert rather than a safe one traveling along the river. However, this defeat was disguised by Arab contemporaries as a legendary victory with one hundred thousand dead enemies.

Despite accounts of the victory against combined Byzantine-Sasanian forces, modern research doubts the existence of Persian forces at the battle, and if there were any, they were "most likely disorganized Persian and Christian Arab elements which escaped to a region guarded by a Byzantine garrison after the earlier Persian defeats." Furthermore, the account of the battle contains suspect elements, such as the number of casualties and the absence of reference to the names of commanders of the allied forces, which ultimately "gives rise to the suspicion that Islamic historiography has attempted to cover up another, less glorious, event." Khalid may have in fact been defeated at the battle.

== Sources ==
- A.I. Akram, The Sword of Allah: Khalid bin al-Waleed, His Life and Campaigns Lahore, 1969
- Crawford, Peter (2014). The War of The Three Gods: Romans, Persian and The Rise of Islam. New York: Skyhorse. ISBN 978-1-62914-512-9.
- Kaegi, Walter E. (1995). Byzantium and the Early Islamic Conquests. Cambridge: Cambridge University Press. ISBN 0-521-41172-6.
- Morony, Michael G. (2005). Iraq After the Muslim Conquest. Gorgias Press.
- Muir, William (1891). The Caliphate: Its Rise, Decline, and Fall (Digitized May 19, 2012 ed.). Religious Tract Society. p. 62.
- Pourshariati, Parvaneh (2008). Decline and Fall of the Sasanian Empire:The Sasanian-Parthian Confederacy and the Arab Conquest of Iran. I.B.Tauris.
- Takirtakoglou, Konstantinos (2021). "The Battle of Firāḍ: The Day on Which Khālid b. al-Walīd Did [Not] Defeat Both Byzantines and Persians". Journal of Medieval Military History. 19: 1–20. ISBN 9781783275915.
