= 630s =

Decade

The 630s decade ran from January 1, 630, to December 31, 639.

== Events ==
=== 630 ===
==== By place ====
====== Byzantine Empire ======
- March 21 – Emperor Heraclius returns the True Cross, one of the holiest Christian relics, to Jerusalem. He tries to promote Monothelitism, which is rejected by the Christians.
- Heraclius issues a decree that all Jews must become Christian; a massacre follows around Jerusalem and in Galilee (Israel), some survivors fleeing to the Daraa area.
- Chorpan Tarkhan, general of the Khazars, invades and devastates Roman Armenia. He defeats a Persian cavalry force (10,000 men) sent by Shahrbaraz to repel the invasion.

====== Central America ======
- October 1 – Tajoom Ukʼab Kʼahkʼ, the ruler of the Mayan city state of Calakmul in southern Mexico dies after a reign of eight years and is succeeded by Cauac, who reigns until 636.

====== Scandinavia ======
- Yngling King Olof Trätälja founds a colony in Värmland. He is expelled from his native Västergötland (in modern-day Sweden) (according to the Ynglingatal).

====== Britain ======
- King Ricberht of East Anglia dies and is succeeded by Sigeberht, who returns from exile in France. He rules together with his kinsman Ecgric, re-establishing Christianity.
- King Penda of Mercia besieges Exeter in southwest England. King Cadwallon ap Cadfan of Gwynedd lands with a force nearby, and negotiates an alliance with Penda.
- Eanswith, daughter of King Eadbald of Kent, founds the Benedictine Folkestone Priory, the first nunnery in England.

====== Persia ======
- April 27 – King Ardashir III, age 9, is murdered after an 18 month reign. He is succeeded by Shahrbaraz who becomes ruler (shah) of the Sasanian Empire.
- June 9 – Shahrbaraz is killed and succeeded by Borandukht, daughter of former king Khosrow II. She ascends the throne as 26th monarch of Persia.

====== Arabia ======
- January – Battle of Hunayn: Muhammad defeats the Bedouin tribe of Hawazin (12,000 men) in a valley, on one of the roads leading to Ta'if (Western Arabia).
- February 5 – Siege of Ta'if: Muhammad begins to besiege Ta'if and brings battering rams and catapults to suppress the fortress city, but is unable to penetrate it.
- December 11 – Conquest of Mecca: A Muslim army (10,000 men) marches on Mecca, which surrenders. Muhammad takes the city from the Quraysh

====== Asia ======
- Illig Qaghan, ruler (khagan) of the Eastern Turkic Khaganate, is captured by Li Jing during the Tang campaign against the Eastern Turks.

==== By topic ====
====== Religion ======
- Xuanzang, Chinese Buddhist monk (bhikkhu), travels across the Gobi Desert to Kumul. Following the Tian Shan mountain range of Central Asia westwards, he arrives in Turpan.

=== 631 ===
==== By place ====
====== Byzantine Empire ======
- Emperor Heraclius appoints Cyrus, patriarch of Alexandria, with power to act as viceroy (dioikesis) of Egypt. He begins a 10-year persecution against the non-Chalcedonian Coptic Christians.

====== Europe ======
- Battle of Wogastisburg: The Slavs under King Samo defeat the Austrasian Franks, in a three-day battle near Trenčín (modern Slovakia). King Dagobert I is forced to retreat; the Franks with their allies are slaughtered. Samo invades Thuringia and undertakes looting raids.
- King Suintila is overthrown after a 10-year reign by his son Sisenand, with the aid of Dagobert I. The Visigothic nobles offer him a 500-pound plate made of pure gold. Sisenand becomes new king of the Visigothic Kingdom and declares his father a tyrant for his many crimes.
- The Saxons (Northern Germany) appeal to Dagobert I, against the yearly tribute (500 cows) which they still pay (approximate date).

====== Britain ======
- King Edwin of Northumbria refortifies the city walls of York, probably including the building of the so-called Anglian Tower (approximate date).

====== Persia ======
- Azarmidokht (daughter of king Khosrau II) succeeds her sister Borandukht, as monarch of the Persian Empire.
- Azarmidokht is succeeded after a few months reign by Khosrau IV, who becomes new ruler (shah) of Persia.
- Hormizd VI proclaims himself king in Nisibis (Turkey). He seizes the throne and will reign until 632.

====== Asia ======
- Emperor Tai Zong sends envoys to the Xueyantuo, vassals of the Eastern Turkic Khaganate, bearing gold and silk in order to obtain the release of enslaved Chinese prisoners, who were captured during the transition from the Sui to the Tang dynasty from the northern frontier. The embassy succeeds in freeing 80,000 men and women, who are safely returned to China.
- Tai Zong establishes a new Daoist abbey, out of gratitude for Daoist priests who had apparently cured the crown prince of an illness.

==== By topic ====
====== Religion ======
- Benjamin I, Coptic patriarch of Alexandria, escapes during the persecutions of his fellow Christians and hides in the monastery of St. Macarius (Upper Egypt).
- Xuanzang, Chinese Buddhist monk, crosses the Indus River at Hund and travels to Kashmir ("Heaven on Earth") in northwestern India (approximate date).

=== 632 ===
==== By place ====
====== Arabia ======
- March 18 (approximate) – Muhammad makes his final sermon to the Muslims. It is believed by Shia to be the appointment of Ali ibn Abi Talib as his successor. The Imamah (Shia doctrine) of Ali Ibn Abi Talib, for the religious, spiritual and political leadership of the Ummah, begins.
- June 8 – Muhammad dies at Medina at the age of 62, after an illness and fever.
- June – Abu Bakr (born Abdallah ibn Uthman ibn Amir, better known by his Islamic laqab Al-Siddiq) becomes the Caliph.
- June – The first caliph, Abu Bakr, sends an expedition to Balqa, Byzantine Empire, led by Usama ibn Zayd. This expedition is sent based on Muhammad's decision before his death.
- Ridda Wars: Abu Bakr launches a series of military campaigns against rebel Arabian tribes, to re-establish the power of the Rightly Guided Caliphs, and to secure Muhammad's legacy.
- September – Battle of Buzakha: An Islamic column (6,000 men) under Khalid ibn al-Walid defeats the Apostate rebels under Tulayha, near Ha'il (Saudi Arabia).
- December – Battle of Aqraba: The Muslim forces of Abu Bakr defeat the Apostate rebels (40,000 men) under Musaylimah, on the plain of Aqraba.

====== Europe ======
- April 8 – King Charibert II is assassinated at Blaye (Gironde), (possibly on orders of his half-brother Dagobert I), along with his infant son. Dagobert I claims Aquitaine and Gascony, becoming the most powerful Merovingian king in the West.
- Part of Samo's rebellion, Alciocus leads 9,000 Bulgars from Pannonia to refuge with Dagobert (who massacres them), then, with 700 survivors, settles with the Wends, under the protection of Walluc.
- Kubrat, ruler of the Dulo clan, takes power from the Pannonian Avars and establishes Old Great Bulgaria in the area of Black Cumania. Kubrat's rule stretches from Dacia to Poltava.

====== Persia ======
- June 16 – Yazdegerd III, age 8, ascends to the throne as king (shah) of the Persian Empire. He becomes the last ruler of the Sassanid Dynasty (modern Iran).

====== Asia ======
- January 27 – An annular eclipse of the sun occurs.
- Seondeok is crowned queen of Silla (Korea).

====== Armenia ======
- The 632 Armenia earthquake affects the region of the Armenian Highlands.

==== By topic ====
====== Religion ======
- March 6 (Friday, 9 Zulhijja, 10 AH) – The Farewell Sermon (Khuṭbatu l-Wadāʿ) is delivered by Muhammad, Islamic prophet, in the Uranah valley of Mount Arafat, to the Muslims who have accompanied him for the Hajj (pilgrimage).
- June 8 – Muhammad dies in Medina, at the age of 62, and is succeeded by Abu Bakr who becomes the first caliph (vicegerent of the messenger of God). He establishes the Rashidun Caliphate until 661.
- Xuanzang, Chinese traveler, writes about two huge statues of Buddha carved out of a mountainside in the Bamiyan Valley (Afghanistan).

=== 633 ===
==== By place ====
====== Britain ======
- October 12 – Battle of Hatfield Chase: King Edwin of Northumbria is defeated and killed by Penda of Mercia and Cadwallon of Gwynedd, at Hatfield Chase (South Yorkshire).
- Osric succeeds his uncle Edwin as king of Deira. Prince Eanfrith returns from Pictland to claim his rightful crown of Bernicia (Northern England). Both revert to paganism.
- Winter – Cadwallon is besieged by King Osric at York; he successfully breaks out of the city with all his forces, by surprise, and destroys Osric's army.

====== Arabia ======
- Ridda Wars: Abu Bakr, caliph (khalifa) of the Rashidun Caliphate, launches a military campaign against the Arab tribe of Kinda, which inhabits the region of Najran (Yemen).
- March 18 – The Arabian Peninsula is united under the central authority of Abu Bakr. This sets the stage for the Islamic conquest of Persia and the fall of the Sassanid dynasty.
- April – Battle of Chains (Kuwait) and Battle of River (Iraq): A Muslim army (18,000 men) under Khalid ibn al-Walid invades Mesopotamia, and wins decisive victories.
- May – Battle of Walaja: The Rashidun Caliphate army under Khalid defeats the Persians and their Arab Christian allies. The Persian army is at least three times the size.
- Battle of Ullais: Forces of the Rashidun Caliphate under Khalid defeat an entire Persian army (70,000 men) near the river Euphrates. Khalid besieges the city of Hira.
- Siege of Hira: The Muslim Arabs (15,000 men) under Khalid attack the fortress city of Hira. After a brief fight the citizens surrender, and bring gifts to Khalid.
- July – Siege of Anbar: A Muslim Arab army under Khalid besieges the fortress city of Anbar. The Persian governor surrenders and is allowed to retire.
- Battle of Ein ut Tamr: The Muslim army attacks a Persian frontier post located south of Anbar. The Arab Christian auxiliaries are overrun and surrender.
- August – Battle of Dumat Al-Jandal: A Muslim army (10,000 men) under Khalid defeats the rebel Arab Christians at Dumat Al-Jandal (Saudi Arabia).
- November – Battle of Muzayyah, Battle of Saniyy, and Battle of Zumail: Khalid coordinates successful night attacks against the Arab Christians.

==== By topic ====
====== Arts and sciences ======
- Li Chungfeng builds an armillary sphere (approximate date).

====== Religion ======
- December 5 – Fourth Council of Toledo: King Sisenand orders a meeting in the church of St. Leocadia; the bishops accept a decree that all Visigoths must take an oath to preserve the stability of the Gothic nation.
- Paulinus of York flees with Queen Æthelburga and her daughter Eanflæd, age 7, south to Kent, where he is made bishop of Rochester. Eanflæd grows up under the protection of her uncle, King Eadbald of Kent.

=== 634 ===
==== By place ====
====== Byzantine Empire ======
- Arab–Byzantine War: Emperor Heraclius, ill, infirm, and unpopular with the Eastern Orthodox Church, is unable to personally lead the Byzantine army to resist the Muslim conquest of the Levant. He sends his brother Theodore to assemble forces to retake the newly won Muslim territories. Monophysites and Jews throughout Syria welcome the Arab invaders, as they are discontented with Byzantine rule.
- July 30 – Battle of Ajnadayn: Byzantine forces (90,000 men according to Muslim sources) under Theodore are defeated by the Rashidun Caliphate near Beit Shemesh (modern-day Israel). Heraclius, who is in Emesa, flees to Antioch upon hearing news of the battle's outcome.

====== Europe ======
- King Dagobert I is forced by the Austrasian nobles to put his 3-year-old son Sigebert III on the throne, ceding royal power in Austrasia. He frees himself from dependence on Pepin of Landen, and extends his rule over the Bretons (approximate date).

====== Britain ======
- Eanfrith of Bernicia and his bodyguard are killed by King Cadwallon of Gwynedd, in an attempt to negotiate peace. Eanfrith's brother Oswald returns from 18 years exile in Dál Riata (modern Scotland), to claim the crown of Northumbria.
- Battle of Heavenfield: Oswald, possibly accompanied by a force of Scots (or Picts), defeats and kills Cadwallon with a Welsh army near Hexham (northern England). He reunites Deira with Bernicia, and becomes king of Northumbria.

====== Persia ======
- Battle of the Bridge: Persian forces (10,000 men) under Bahman Jadhuyih defeat the Muslim Arabs at the Euphrates (near Kufa). The sight of elephants panics the Muslims, and many are killed. Bahman does not pursue the fleeing Arab army.

====== Arabia ======
- Battle of Firaz: The Rashidun Arabs (15,000 men) under Khalid ibn al-Walid defeat the combined forces of the Byzantine Empire, Persian Empire and Arab Christians (at least 10 times larger than Khalid's army) in Mesopotamia (Iraq).
- February 4 – Battle of Dathin: Rashidun forces under Yazid ibn Abi Sufyan defeat the Christian Arabs around Gaza. The Muslim victory is celebrated by the local Jews, who have been a persecuted minority within the Byzantine Empire.
- The Rashidun Caliphate starts the Islamic conquest of the Byzantine Empire, when Muslim forces under Abu Ubaidah ibn al-Jarrah invade the Levant. Khalid sets out for Syria from Al-Hirah, taking with him half his army, about 8,000 strong.
- Battle of al-Qaryatayn: The Muslim Arabs under Khalid defeat the Ghassanids at Al-Qaryatayn, after the inhabitants resist his proposals. His army conquers and plunders the city, before proceeding to capture other towns in the area.
- Battle of Marj Rahit: A Muslim Arab army under Khalid defeats the Byzantine forces (15,000 men) and their Ghassanid allies. After the battle he sends a mounted column to the outskirts of Damascus, to plunder the region.
- Battle of Bosra: Muslim forces under Khalid besiege the Byzantine and Christian Arab garrison (12,000 men) at Bosra. After a few days the fortress city surrenders; Khalid imposes a payment of tribute on the inhabitants.
- August 23 – Abu Bakr dies at Medina and is succeeded by Umar I, who becomes the second caliph (khalifah) of the Rashidun Caliphate. During his rule, Umar conquers Syria, Persia, and Egypt in a "Holy War".
- September 19 – Siege of Damascus: Muslim Arabs under Khalid conquer Damascus as the first major city of the Byzantine Empire. Damascan refugees are given a guarantee of safety to retreat to Antioch.
- Battle of Maraj-al-Debaj: A Byzantine convoy of Damascan refugees (10,000 men) is slaughtered by a Muslim army near Antioch. The Mobile Guard (elite light cavalry) captures a great amount of brocade.

====== Asia ======
- The Tuyuhun Kingdom is invaded by Chinese forces under Li Jing (Tang dynasty) during Emperor Taizong's campaign against Tuyuhun, resulting in the murder of their leader (khan) Murong Fuyun in 635.
- Tai Zong orders the construction of the Daming Palace in Chang'an. He builds the summer palace for his retired father, Emperor Gao Zu, as an act of filial piety.

==== By topic ====
====== Religion ======
- Aidan of Lindisfarne, Irish missionary, is summoned by King Oswald from Iona (Inner Hebrides) to establish a bishopric on the holy island of Lindisfarne, and reestablish Christianity in Northumbria (approximate date).
- Birinus, Frankish missionary, lands at the port of "Hamwic" (now in the St. Mary's area of Southampton), on his mission to reconvert the West Saxons in England. About this time, the St Mary's Church is founded.
- Sophronius becomes patriarch of Jerusalem. He sends synodical letters to Pope Honorius I and the Eastern patriarchs, explaining the Orthodox belief, by renouncing Monothelitism.

=== 635 ===
==== By place ====
====== Byzantine Empire ======
- Emperor Heraclius makes an alliance with Kubrat, ruler (khagan) of Great Bulgaria, to break the power of the Avars on the Balkan Peninsula.

====== Europe ======
- Judicaël, high king of Domnonée (Brittany), visits King Dagobert I at his palace in Clichy (northwest of Paris), to promise he will remain under Frankish lordship. The Breton king arrives with gifts, but insults Dagobert by refusing to eat at the royal table.

====== Britain ======
- King Meurig of Glywysing and Gwent invades Ergyng (Archenfield), and reunites the two Welsh kingdoms (approximate date).
- King Gartnait III dies after a 4-year reign, and is succeeded by his brother Bridei II, as ruler of the Picts.

====== Arabia ======
- January – Battle of Fahl: The Rashidun army, (30,000 men) under Khalid ibn al-Walid (known as the "Drawn Sword of God"), defeats the Byzantine forces led by Theodore Trithyrius, at Pella in the Jordan Valley (Jordan).
- Gaza is conquered by the Muslim Arabs under 'Amr ibn al-'As. It becomes the first city in Palestine developed into a centre of Islamic law.

==== By topic ====
====== Literature ======
- Yao Silian, Chinese historian, completes his Book of Liang. It contains the history of the Liang dynasty.

====== Religion ======
- Christian missionaries arrive in China: Alopen, bishop of the Assyrian Church of the East, preaches Nestorian Christianity in the Tang dynasty capital, Chang'an.
- Aidan of Lindisfarne, Irish missionary, founds the monastery of Lindisfarne in Northumbria (northern England).
- Birinus, Frankish missionary, converts King Cynegils of Wessex and becomes the first Bishop of Dorchester.

=== 636 ===
==== By place ====
====== Byzantine Empire ======
- Arab–Byzantine War: Emperor Heraclius assembles a large army consisting of contingents of Byzantines, Slavs, Franks, Georgians, Armenians, and Christian Arabs. He establishes a base at Yaqusah (near Gadara), close to the edge of the Golan Heights, protecting the vital main road from Egypt to Damascus. The base is protected by deep valleys and precipitous cliffs, well supplied with water and grazing.
- Summer – Heraclius summons a church assembly at Antioch, and scrutinises the situation. He accepts the argument that Byzantine disobedience to God is to blame for the Christian disaster in Syria. Heraclius leaves for Constantinople with the words, 'Peace be with you Syria — what a beautiful land you will be for your enemy'.

====== Central America ======
- April 28 – Yuknoom Chʼeen II becomes the ruler of the Mayan city state of Calakmul in southern Mexico and reigns for 50 years until his death in 686.

====== Europe ======
- Chintila is elected by a convention of bishops and nobles (in accordance with the 75th canon of the Fourth Council of Toledo) as ruler of the Visigoths, after the death of King Sisenand.
- Rothari (formerly duke of Brescia) marries widowed Queen Gundeberga, and succeeds Arioald as king of the Lombards. During his reign, he puts many insubordinate nobles to death.

====== Arabia ======
- August 15–20 – Battle of Yarmouk: In engagements along the Yarmouk River, Muslim forces (25,000 men) of the Rashidun Caliphate, led by Khalid ibn al-Walid, decisively defeat the armies of the Byzantine Empire, effectively completing the Muslim conquest of Syria. It will be regarded as one of the most decisive battles in military history, marking the first great wave of Muslim conquests, after the death of Muhammad.
- The city of Basra (modern Iraq) is founded on the Shatt al-Arab, at the head of the Persian Gulf. The port will become a major trading center for commodities from Arabia, India, and Persia.
- November 16–19 – Battle of al-Qādisiyyah: The Muslim Arab army defeats the Persian forces under Rostam Farrokhzād, at Al-Qādisiyyah (Southern Mesopotamia).

====== Asia ======
- The Xumi Pagoda of Zhengding (China) is built, during the reign of Emperor Taizong of Tang.

==== By topic ====
====== Literature ======
- The historical texts of the Book of Northern Qi, Book of Chen, and Book of Sui are compiled in China, during the Tang dynasty.

====== Religion ======
- Birinus, Bishop of Dorchester, converts Cwichelm (son of king Cynegils of Wessex) to Christianity. He dies soon afterward, and is supposedly buried at Scutchamer Knob, in East Hendred (South East England).
- June 30 – Fifth Council of Toledo: Chintila orders a meeting in the church of St. Leocadia; the bishops accept a decree that only Gothic nobility (with military functions) may be king of the Visigothic Kingdom.

=== 637 ===
==== By place ====
====== Britain ======
- June 24 – Battle of Mag Rath: King Oswald of Northumbria sends troops to Ireland, to assist Domnall Brecc King of Dál Riata in his alliance with King Congal Cáech of Ulaid against Domnall mac Áedo High King of Ireland, during the Irish dynastic wars. Domnall Brecc, Congal and their forces are defeated near Moira. At the Mull of Kintyre (southwest Scotland), Domnall mac Áedo's fleet destroys Domnall Brecc's naval force of Dál Riata.

====== Persia ======
- March – Siege of Ctesiphon: The Rashidun army (15,000 men) under Saʿd ibn Abi Waqqas occupies the Persian capital of Ctesiphon, after a two-month siege. King Yazdegerd III flees with the imperial treasure eastward into Media. Muslim forces conquer the Persian provinces as far as Khuzestan (modern Iran).
- Battle of Jalula: Muslim Arabs defeat the Persian forces (20,000 men) under Farrukhzad at the Diyala River. The cities Tikrit and Mosul are captured, completing the conquest of Mesopotamia. The region west of the Zagros Mountains is annexed by the Rashidun Caliphate.

====== Arabian Empire ======
- April – Siege of Jerusalem: The Rashidun army (20,000 men), led by 'Amr ibn al-'As, conquers Jerusalem after a six-month siege. The Byzantine garrison surrenders to Caliph Umar I, who is invited by Sophronius, patriarch of Jerusalem, to pray in the Church of the Holy Sepulchre. Umar declines, fearing that accepting the invitation might endanger the church's status, and turn the Christian holy site into a mosque.
- Battle of Hazir: Muslim Arab forces (17,000 men) under Khalid ibn al-Walid defeat the Byzantine army near Qinnasrin (Northern Syria). The cities of Beirut and Tyre are captured by Yazid ibn Abi Sufyan after a short siege.
- October – Siege of Aleppo: Muslim Arabs under Khalid ibn al-Walid conquer the Byzantine stronghold Aleppo; the large walled city surrenders after a four-month siege. A column of troops under Malik al-Ashtar is sent to take Azaz.
- Battle of the Iron Bridge: Rashidun forces under Khalid ibn al-Walid defeat the Byzantine army and Christian Arabs near Antioch, at the Orontes River. It marks the complete annexation of Syria into the Rashidun Caliphate.

====== Asia ======
- Chang'an, capital of the Tang dynasty (China), becomes the largest city of the world, taking the lead from Ctesiphon, capital of Persia.
- Queen Seondeok of Silla (Korea) builds an astronomical observatory near Gyeongju (Cheomseongdae), one of the oldest in East Asia.
- King Songtsän Gampo builds the first palace on the site of the Potala Palace in Lhasa (Tibet).

==== By topic ====
====== Religion ======
- The Muslims replace Zoroastrianism with Islam in Mesopotamia (later Iraq); they do not force their conquered subjects to embrace the Islamic faith, but they do require acceptance of the Quran as the doctrine of divine teaching, and will oblige their subjects to learn Arabic (approximate date).

=== 638 ===
==== By place ====
====== Byzantine Empire ======
- Emperor Heraclius creates a buffer zone (or no man's land) in the heartland of Asia Minor. In the mountainous terrain of Anatolia, the Byzantine forces develop a system of defensive guerrilla warfare. The strategy is known as ‘shadowing warfare’, as it avoids battle with major Muslim invaders, and instead attacks raiding parties on their return when they are laden with booty, captured livestock or prisoners.
- July 4 – Heraklonas, age 12, son of Heraclius, obtains (through the influence of his mother Martina) the title of Augustus. This brings him in rivalry with his elder half-brother Constantine.
- Heraclius issues his Ekthesis, espousing the Monothelete doctrine (that there is only one will in Christ), and setting it forth as the official doctrine of the Eastern Orthodox Church. The Ekthesis is vigorously opposed, notably by Maximus the Confessor.

====== Britain ======
- King Oswald and his Northumbrian army besiege and conquer Edinburgh (Scotland). His half-brother, Oswiu of Bernicia, marries Princess Rhiainfelt, heiress of North Rheged ("Old North"). Northumbria embraces North Rheged in a peaceful takeover, and Oswiu becomes a sub-king (approximate date).

====== Arabian Empire ======
- January – The Plague of Amwas breaks out.
- Autumn – The Arabian forces under Abu Ubaidah ibn al-Jarrah storm Caesarea Maritima, capital of Byzantine Palestine, and effect their final capture of Ascalon (modern Israel). Caliph Umar I stops the Muslim invasion, and appoints Abu Ubaidah governor of Syria.
- Arab-Byzantine War: The invading Rashidun army under Khalid ibn al-Walid moves into Anatolia, conquering (without strong Byzantine resistance) the cities of Kahramanmaraş, Caesarea Cappadociae, Sebastia, and Malatya (west of the Taurus Mountains). Arab forces march into Armenia, where they capture the cities Edessa and Amida up to the Ararat plain.
- Umar I dismisses Khalid ibn al-Walid after the conquest of Syria, owing to his ever-growing fame and influence. He wants the Muslims to know that victory comes from God, not his general.
- Abu Musa al-Asha'ari, companion (sahabah) of Muhammad, establishes Hafar al-Batin, located in the northeastern region of the Arabian Peninsula. He orders the digging for new wells, along this desert route that Muslims travel from Iraq to Mecca for the Hajj (pilgrimage).

====== Asia ======
- The Tibetan Empire, seeking an alliance through marriage with Tang dynasty China, launches an attack on Songzhou that is repelled by Chinese forces, but is followed by the marriage of the Chinese Princess Wencheng to Tibetan ruler Songtsän Gampo.

==== By topic ====
====== Arts and sciences ======
- The Islamic calendar is introduced by Abu Musa al-Asha'ari. He convinces Umar I to make notes of an era for Muslims.
- March 22 – Year 0 of the Burmese calendar, based on the Chula Sakarat, is also used in the mainland of Southeast Asia.

====== Religion ======
- October 12 – Pope Honorius I dies at Rome after a 13-year reign, and is succeeded by Severinus, but the Byzantine emperor Heraclius will delay the new pope's consecration until May 640.
- December 20 – Pyrrhus I becomes patriarch of Constantinople, after the death of Sergius I. He has been an advocate of Monothelitism and a close friend of Heraclius.

=== 639 ===
==== By place ====
====== Europe ======
- January 19 – Dagobert I dies after a 10-year reign as king of all the Franks, in which his realm has prospered. He is succeeded by Sigebert III (age 9), independent ruler of Austrasia, and his half-brother Clovis II (age 2), who becomes king of Neustria and Burgundy. Under the supervision of Pepin of Landen, Mayor of the Palace, the royal treasury is distributed between the two brothers and widowed queen Nanthild (regent on Clovis' behalf).

====== Arabian Empire ======
- Arab–Byzantine War: The Rashidun army (4,000 men), under the command of 'Amr ibn al-'As, invades Byzantine Egypt. They capture the strategic town of Pelusium (Nile Delta) after a two-month siege. Arab reinforcements led by Zubayr ibn al-Awwam are sent from Medina to assist Amr's army. The losses incurred by the Muslims are ameliorated by Sinai Bedouins, tribes of Rashida and Lakhm; they join the invaders in conquering Egypt.
- Hormuzan, Persian satrap of Susiana (vassal of the Rashidun Caliphate), revolts against the Muslims and raids Mesopotamia. Arab forces under Abu Musa al-Asha'ari destroy Susa in the lower Zagros Mountains.
- Plague of Emmaus: An epidemic disease which has broken out in Emmaus (Imwas) in Palestine strikes the city and the military camps of the Muslim Arabs, killing most of its population (estimated at 25,000 people) until it subsides in October.

====== Asia ======
- The Xueyantuo assaults the Chinese-conquered vassal of Eastern Tujue. Although simultaneously fighting in Korea against Goguryeo, Emperor Tai Zong commissions his famous general Li Shiji to fend off attacks in the campaign against Xueyantuo.
- An unsuccessful revolt of Prince Kürşat (of the Eastern Turks) breaks out in China.

==== By topic ====
====== Religion ======
- Eligius succeeds Acarius as bishop of Doornik and Noyon. He becomes constituted guardian of the towns of Vermandois, which also include Ghent and Kortrijk (Flanders).
- The First Cathedral of Santa Maria Assunta is founded by the exarch Isaac of Ravenna on Torcello, confirming the island's importance as a centre of population in Venice at this date.

== Significant people ==
- Abu Bakr
- Ali
- Khalid ibn al-Walid
- Muhammad
- Queen Seondeok of Silla
- Yazdegerd III

== Births ==
630

- November 7 – Constans II, Byzantine emperor (d. 668)
- Alhfrith, king of Deira (approximate date)
- Conon I, pope of the Catholic Church (approximate date)
- Di Renjie, chancellor of the Tang dynasty (d. 700)
- Fausta, Byzantine empress (approximate date)
- Nukata, Japanese poet (approximate date)
- Reineldis, Frankisch saint (approximate date)
- Sigebert III, king of Austrasia (approximate date)

631

- Muhammad ibn Abi Bakr, son of Abu Bakr and brought up by Ali
- Temmu, emperor of Japan (approximate date)
- Yeh Fa-shan, Daoist wonder-worker (d. 720)

632

- Al-Muhallab ibn Abi Sufra, Arab general (d. 702)
- Vindicianus, bishop of Cambrai (approximate date)

633

- Clovis II, king of Neustria and Burgundy
- Jamadevi, queen of Hariphunchai (Thailand) (approximate date)
- Wilfrid, Anglo-Saxon bishop (approximate date)

634

- Athanasius II Baldoyo, patriarch of Antioch (d. 686)
- Chad of Mercia, Anglo-Saxon abbot (d. 672)
- Cuthbert, Anglo-Saxon bishop (approximate date)
- En no Ozunu, Japanese ascetic (approximate date)

635

- Benedict II, pope of the Catholic Church (d. 685)
- John V, pope of the Catholic Church (d. 686)
- Kʼinich Kan Bahlam II, ruler of Palenque (d. 702)
- Pepin of Herstal, Mayor of the Palace (approximate date)
- Yijing, Chinese Buddhist monk and traveler (d. 713)

636

- Æthelthryth, Anglo-Saxon princess (approximate date)
- Lambert of Maastricht, bishop (approximate date)

638

- Huineng, Chinese Zen Buddhist patriarch of the Tang dynasty (d. 713)

639

- Aldegonde, Frankish abbess (approximate date)
- Aldhelm, bishop of Sherborne (approximate date)
- Ecgberht of Ripon, bishop of Lindisfarne (d. 729)
- Yeon Namsan, military leader of Goguryeo (d. 701)

== Deaths ==
630

- April 27 – Ardashir III, king of the Persian Empire
- June 9 – Shahrbaraz, king of the Persian Empire
- Du Ruhui, chancellor of the Tang dynasty (b. 585)
- Ricberht, king of East Anglia (approximate date)

631

- Athanasius I Gammolo, Syriac Orthodox Patriarch of Antioch.
- Borandukht, queen of the Persian Empire
- Cinaed mac Luchtren, king of the Picts
- Rayhana, slave and wife of Muhammad

632

- January 27 – Ibrahim, son of Muhammad
- January 31 – Máedóc, bishop of Ferns
- April 8 – Charibert II, king of Aquitaine
- June 8 – Muhammad, Islamic Prophet (b. 570)
- August 11 – Rusticula (b. c. 556), abbess of Arles
- August 28 – Fatimah, daughter of Muhammad
- October 12 or 633 – Edwin of Northumbria, king of Deira and Bernicia
- October 29 – Saint Colman mac Duagh, Irish abbot and bishop
- Abu Dujana, companion of Muhammad
- Chilperic, son of Charibert II
- Abdullah ibn Suhayl (b. 594) (martyred)
- Abu Hudhayfa ibn Utba (b. 581) (martyred)
- Salim Mawla Abu Hudhayfa (b. c. 594–596) (martyred)
- Zayd ibn al-Khattab (b. before 584) (martyred)
- Musaylimah, Arabian prophet

633

- October 12 or 632 – Edwin, king of Northumbria
- Osric, king of Deira (approximate date)
- Suintila, king of the Visigoths (approximate date)
- Dai Zhou, chancellor of the Tang dynasty

634

- August 23 – Abu Bakr, Muslim Caliph
- Cadwallon, king of Gwynedd (Wales)
- Eanfrith, king of Bernicia (northern England)
- Sigeberht, king of East Anglia (approximate date)

635

- June 25 – Gao zu, emperor of the Tang dynasty (b. 566)
- Chen Shuda, prince and chancellor of the Tang dynasty
- Gartnait III, king of the Picts
- Wu Shihuo, father of Wu Zetian (b. 559)

636

- April 4 – Isidore of Seville, archbishop and scholar
- Arioald, king of the Lombards
- Bahman Jadhuyih, Persian general
- Dervan, prince of the Sorbs
- Ecgric, king of East Anglia (approximate date)
- Cwichelm, king of Wessex (approximate date)
- George Pisida, Byzantine poet (approximate date)
- Jalinus, Armenian nobleman
- Rostam Farrokhzād, Persian general (or 637)
- Sa'd ibn Ubadah, companion of Muhammad (approximate date)
- Sisenand, king of the Visigoths
- Theodore Trithyrius, Byzantine general (sacellarius)
- Zhangsun, empress of the Tang dynasty (b. 601)

637

- Andreas of Caesarea, bishop and writer (b. 563)
- Congal Cáech, high king of Dál nAraidi (Ireland)
- John Athalarichos, illegitimate son of Heraclius
- Maria al-Qibtiyya, concubine of Muhammad
- Mo Chua, Irish bishop and founder of Balla
- Mo Chutu, Irish abbot and founder of Lismore Abbey
- Rostam Farrokhzād, Persian general (or 636)
- Wen Yanbo, chancellor of the Tang dynasty (b. 575)

638

- March 11 – Sophronius, patriarch of Jerusalem
- October 12 – Pope Honorius I
- December 9 – Sergius I, patriarch of Constantinople
- Qin Shubao, general of the Tang dynasty
- Yu Shinan, calligrapher and official (b. 558)

639

- January 19 – Dagobert I, king of the Franks (b. c. 603)
- February 3 – K'inich Yo'nal Ahk I, ajaw of Piedras Negras
- November 27 – Acarius, bishop of Doornik and Noyon
- Suhayl ibn Amr (b. c. 556)
- Abu Jandal ibn Suhayl (b. 594 - 601)
- Abu Ubaidah ibn al-Jarrah, commander of the Rashidun Caliphate (b. 583)
- Muadh ibn Jabal, early Muslim scholar
- Shurahbil ibn Hasana, Rashidun Caliphate general
- Yazid ibn Abi Sufyan, general of the Rashidun Caliphate
- Faílbe Flann mac Áedo Duib, king of Munster (Ireland)
- Wang Gui, chancellor of the Tang dynasty (b. 571)
- Yang Gongren, chancellor of the Tang dynasty
