= 633 =

Calendar year

633 in various calendars
- Gregorian calendar: 633; DCXXXIII
- Ab urbe condita: 1386
- Armenian calendar: 82; ԹՎ ՁԲ
- Assyrian calendar: 5383
- Balinese saka calendar: 554–555
- Bengali calendar: 39–40
- Berber calendar: 1583
- Buddhist calendar: 1177
- Burmese calendar: −5
- Byzantine calendar: 6141–6142
- Chinese calendar: 壬辰年 (Water Dragon); 3330 or 3123 — to — 癸巳年 (Water Snake); 3331 or 3124
- Coptic calendar: 349–350
- Discordian calendar: 1799
- Ethiopian calendar: 625–626
- Hebrew calendar: 4393–4394
- Hindu calendars
- Vikram Samvat: 689–690
- Shaka Samvat: 554–555
- Kali Yuga: 3733–3734
- Holocene calendar: 10633
- Iranian calendar: 11–12
- Islamic calendar: 11–12
- Japanese calendar: N/A
- Javanese calendar: 523–524
- Julian calendar: 633; DCXXXIII
- Korean calendar: 2966
- Minguo calendar: 1279 before ROC 民前1279年
- Nanakshahi calendar: −835
- Seleucid era: 944/945 AG
- Thai solar calendar: 1175–1176
- Tibetan calendar: ཆུ་ཕོ་འབྲུག་ལོ་ (male Water-Dragon); 759 or 378 or −394 — to — ཆུ་མོ་སྦྲུལ་ལོ་ (female Water-Snake); 760 or 379 or −393

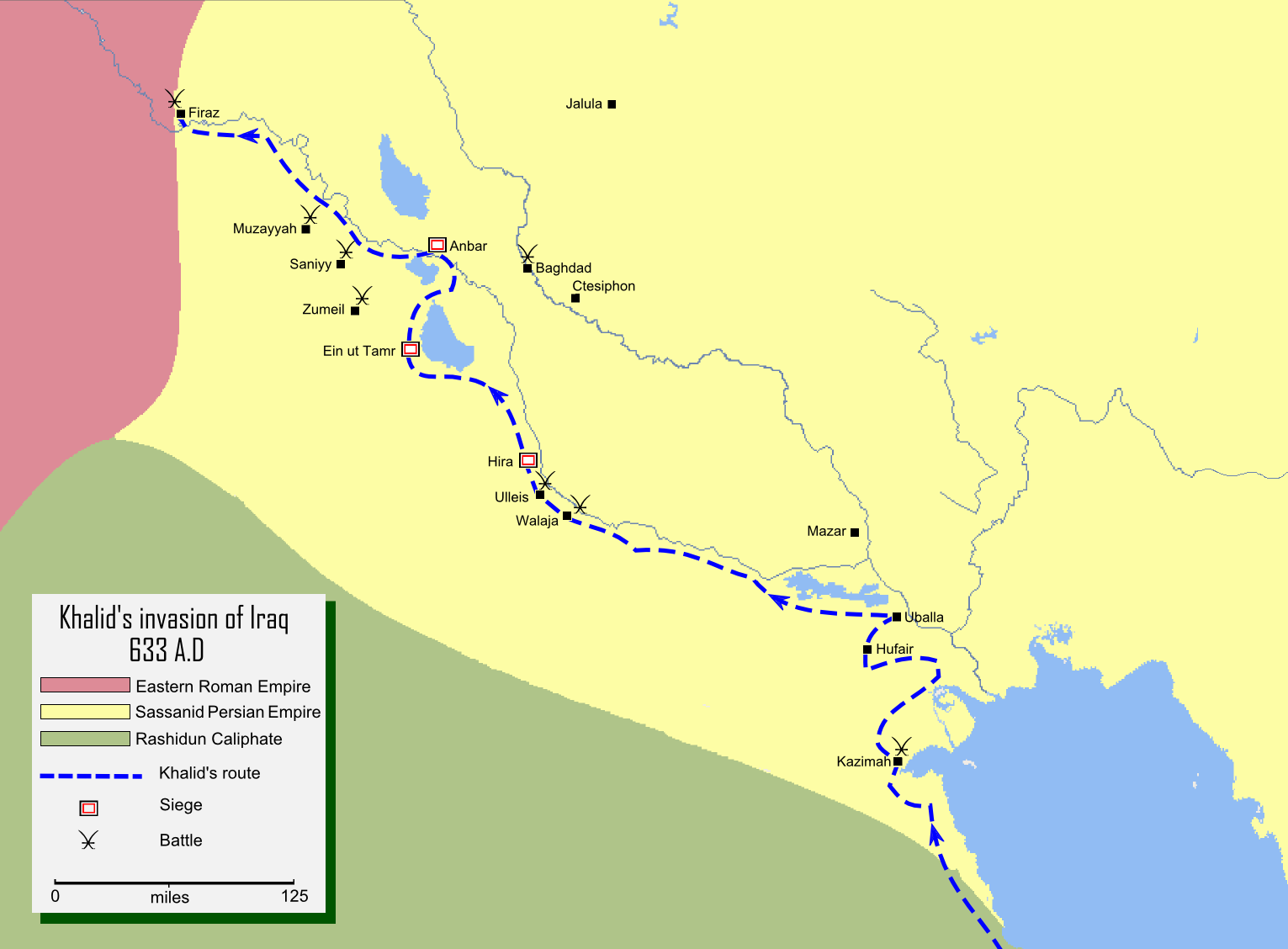
The Rashidun invasion of Khalid ibn al-Walid in Iraq

Year 633 (DCXXXIII) was a common year starting on Friday of the Julian calendar. The denomination 633 for this year has been used since the early medieval period, when the Anno Domini calendar era became the prevalent method in Europe for naming years.

== Events ==
=== By place ===
==== Britain ====
- October 12 – Battle of Hatfield Chase: King Edwin of Northumbria is defeated and killed by Penda of Mercia and Cadwallon of Gwynedd, at Hatfield Chase (South Yorkshire).
- Osric succeeds his uncle Edwin as king of Deira. Prince Eanfrith returns from Pictland to claim his rightful crown of Bernicia (Northern England). Both revert to paganism.
- Winter – Cadwallon is besieged by King Osric at York; he successfully breaks out of the city with all his forces, by surprise, and destroys Osric's army.

==== Spain ====
- Introduction of elective monarchy in The Visigothic Kingdom.

==== Arabia ====
- Ridda Wars: Abu Bakr, caliph (khalifa) of the Rashidun Caliphate, launches a military campaign against the Arab tribe of Kinda, which inhabits the region of Najran (Yemen).
- March 18 – The Arabian Peninsula is united under the central authority of Abu Bakr. This sets the stage for the Islamic conquest of Persia and the fall of the Sassanid dynasty.
- April – Battle of Chains (Kuwait) and Battle of River (Iraq): A Muslim army (18,000 men) under Khalid ibn al-Walid invades Mesopotamia, and wins decisive victories.
- May – Battle of Walaja: The Rashidun Caliphate army under Khalid defeats the Persians and their Arab Christian allies. The Persian army is at least three times the size.
- Battle of Ullais: Forces of the Rashidun Caliphate under Khalid defeat an entire Persian army (70,000 men) near the river Euphrates. Khalid besieges the city of Hira.
- Siege of Hira: The Muslim Arabs (15,000 men) under Khalid attack the fortress city of Hira. After a brief fight the citizens surrender, and bring gifts to Khalid.
- July – Siege of Anbar: A Muslim Arab army under Khalid besieges the fortress city of Anbar. The Persian governor surrenders and is allowed to retire.
- Battle of Ein ut Tamr: The Muslim army attacks a Persian frontier post located south of Anbar. The Arab Christian auxiliaries are overrun and surrender.
- August – Battle of Dumat Al-Jandal: A Muslim army (10,000 men) under Khalid defeats the rebel Arab Christians at Dumat Al-Jandal (Saudi Arabia).
- November – Battle of Muzayyah, Battle of Saniyy, and Battle of Zumail: Khalid coordinates successful night attacks against the Arab Christians.

=== By topic ===
==== Arts and sciences ====
- Li Chungfeng builds an armillary sphere (approximate date).

==== Religion ====
- December 5 – Fourth Council of Toledo: King Sisenand orders a meeting in the church of St. Leocadia; the bishops accept a decree that all Visigoths must take an oath to preserve the stability of the Gothic nation.
- Paulinus of York flees with Queen Æthelburga and her daughter Eanflæd, age 7, south to Kent, where he is made bishop of Rochester. Eanflæd grows up under the protection of her uncle, King Eadbald of Kent.

== Births ==
- Clovis II, king of Neustria and Burgundy
- Jamadevi, queen of Hariphunchai (Thailand) (approximate date)
- Wilfrid, Anglo-Saxon bishop (approximate date)

== Deaths ==
- October 12 or 632 – Edwin, king of Northumbria
- Osric, king of Deira (approximate date)
- Suintila, king of the Visigoths (approximate date)
- Dai Zhou, chancellor of the Tang dynasty
