= Timeline of the history of Islam (7th century) =

This is a timeline of major events in the Muslim world from 601 AD to 700 AD (23 BH – 81 AH).

Timeline of the history of Islam: 6th | 7th | 8th | 9th | 10th | 11th | 12th | 13th | 14th | 15th | 16th | 17th | 18th | 19th | 20th | 21st century

== 7th century (601–700) ==
This century corresponds to approximately 23 BH - 81 AH.

- 602: Birth of Muhammad's third child and second daughter Ruqayyah, wife of third caliph Uthman.
- 604: Birth of Umm Kulthum, third daughter of Muhammad. She became wife of Uthman after the death of her sister Ruqayyah.
- 605: 24 July – Birth of Fatimah, the fourth daughter of Muhammad. She was the wife of Ali ibn Abu Talib and all of Muhammad's descendants are through her.
- 605: Muhammad helps rebuild the Ka'ba.
- 605: Birth of Hafsa, daughter of second caliph Umar and one of the wives of Muhammad.
- 610: 9 February – The first announced revelation of the Qur'an in the cave at Hira. He is given his first revelation from the Angel Gabriel in the cave. Khadija is the first to believe.
- 613: Invitation of the close families of Muhammad to Islam
- 613: Declaration at Mount Safa inviting the general public to Islam
- 614: Birth of Aisha, Daughter of first caliph Abu Bakr and youngest wife of Muhammad.
- 614: Persecution of the Muslims by the Quraish. A party of Muslims migrates to Abyssinia.
- 615: Acceptance of Islam by Hamza and Umar
- 616: Second migration to Abyssinia.
- 617: Boycott of the Hashemites and Muhammad by the Quraish.
- 619: April/May – Lifting of the boycott. Deaths of Abu Talib and Khadija, Year of Sorrow.
- 620: Visit to Taif, as well as Isra and Miraj.
- 622: 9 September – 20 September – Hijra—migration to Medina. First year of Islamic calendar.
- 623: January – Constitution of Medina. Establishment of the first Islamic state.
- 624: Battle of Badr. Expulsion of the Bani Qainuqa Jews from Medina. The direction of prayer is converted from Jerusalem to Mecca.
- 624: Death of Ruqayyah daughter of Muhammad and wife of Uthman.
- 625: Battle of Uhud. Expulsion of Banu Nadir Jews from Medina.
- 625: Birth of Hasan ibn Ali, son of Ali and Fatimah and 2nd Shia imams.
- 626: Birth of Husayn ibn Ali, son of Ali and Fatimah and 3rd Shia imams.
- 627: Battle of the Trench. Invasion of Banu Qurayza.
- 628: Treaty of Hudaybiyyah. Battle of Khaybar. Muhammad sends letters to various heads of states.
- 629: Muhammad pilgrimage to Mecca. Battle of Mu'ta.
- 629: Death of Zainab, eldest daughter of Muhammad and wife of Abu al-As
- 630: 11 January – Conquest of Mecca. Battle of Hunayn. Battle of Autas. Siege of Ta'if.
- 630: Death of Umm Kulthum daughter of Muhammad and wife of Uthman.
- 631: Expedition to Tabouk, Ghassanids.
- 631: Death of Muhammad's son Ibrahim ibn Muhammad from Maria al-Qibtiyya.
- 631 or 632, tribe of Thaqif adopts Islam.
- 632: 6 March – Farewell pilgrimage at Mecca.
- 632: 8 June – Death of Muhammad. Death of Fatimah, his daughter. Abu Bakr is chosen as caliph after a fight at Banu Saqifa among those who left the funeral of prophet . Battles of Zu Qissa. Battles of Zu Abraq. Battle of Buzakha. Battle of Zafar. Battle of Naqra. Muslims defeat Bani Tamim and Mosailima.
- 633: Muslims take Bahrain, Oman, Yemen, and Hadramaut. Raids in Iraq. Battle of Chains, Battle of Saniyy, Battle of Walaja, Battle of Ullais, Battle of Hira, Battle of Al-Anbar, Battle of Ayn al-Tamr, Battle of Dawmat al-Jandal, Battle of Firaz.
- 634: 22 August – Death of Abu Bakr, the first caliph of Islam. Umar ibn al-Khattab assumes power as the second caliph.
- 634: Battle of Bosra, Battle of Damascus, Battle of Ajnadin. Death of Abu Bakr. Battle of Namaraq, Battle of Saqatia.
- 635: Battle of Bridge, Battle of Buwaib, Conquest of Damascus, Battle of Fahl.
- 636: Battle of Yarmuk, Battle of al-Qādisiyyah, Conquest of Madain. Naval raid by Muslims on at Tanah, near Mumbai.
- 637: Conquest of Syria, Conquest of Jerusalem, Battle of Jalula.
- 638: Conquest of Jazirah.
- 639: Conquest of Khuzistan. Advance into Egypt. Plague of Emmaus.
- 640: Battle of Babylon in Egypt.
- 641: Conquest of Alexandria in Egypt.
- 642: Battle of Nihawand; Conquest of Egypt.
- 643: Conquest of Azarbaijan and Tabaristan (Mazandaran).
- 644:
  - Conquest of Fars, Kerman, Sistan, Mekran and Kharan.
  - 5 November – Umar, the second caliph, is assassinated and buried in the house of Aisha in Medina. Uthman ibn Affan becomes the caliph.
- 646: Muslims take Khurasan, Armenia and Asia Minor.
- 647: Muslims take North Africa. Conquest of the island of Cyprus.
- 648: Muslims battle against the Byzantines.
- 650: First conflict between Arabs and Turks. Khazars defeated an Arab force led by Abd ar-Rahman ibn Rabiah outside the Khazar town of Balanjar.
- 652: Disaffection against the rule of Uthman.
- 655: Naval battle of the Masts against the Byzantines.
- 656:
  - In the summer a band of tribesmen from Egypt comes to Medina and after unsuccessful negotiations they attack and kill Uthman, the third Caliph. Ali ibn Abi Talib becomes the fourth caliph.
  - 10 December – Battle of the Camel outside Basra between forces loyal to Ali and dissidents. Decisive victory for Ali.
- 657:
  - Ali shifts the capital from Medina to Kufa.
  - Battle of Siffin in the late spring or early summer between Ali's and Muawiyah's forces.
- 658: Ali scores a major victory against the Kharijites at the Battle of Nahrawan.
- 659: Conquest of Egypt by Muawiyah I.
- 659/60: The Syrians pledge their allegiance to Muawiyah as caliph.
- 660: Ali recaptures Hijaz and Yemen from Muawiyah. Muawiyah I declares himself as the caliph at Damascus.
- 661:
  - 29 January – Ali, fourth Caliph, is assassinated in Kufa, reportedly by Kharijites. He is buried in Najaf, Iraq.
  - Muawiyah marches on Kufa and wins the acceptance of most of Ali's remaining supporters, marking the end of the Fitna.
- 662: Kharijites' revolts.
- 666: Muawia bin Hudeij raids Sicily. Abdu'l-Rahman ibn Abu Bakr, Muhammad ibn Maslamah and Ramlah bint Abi Sufyan dies.
- 669: Hasan ibn Ali, the second Imam of the Shiites died. Husayn ibn Ali becomes Imam of Ali ibn Abi Talib's followers.

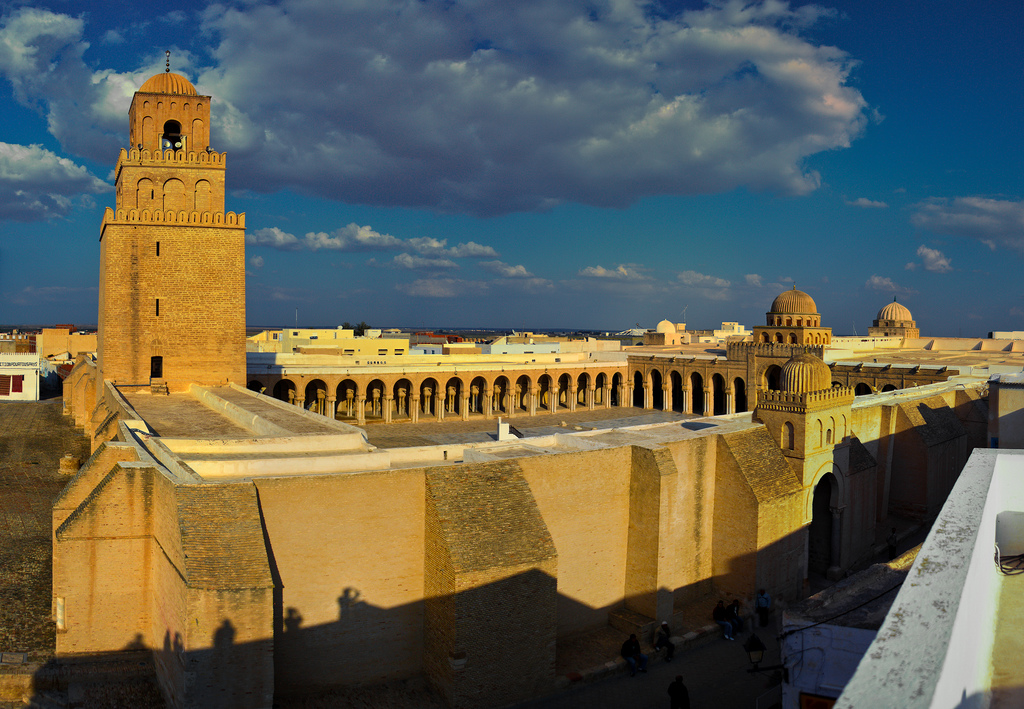
View of the Mosque of Uqba founded in 670 by Uqba bin Nafe, Kairouan, Tunisia.

- 670: Advance in North Africa. Uqba bin Nafe founds the town of Kairouan in Tunisia. Conquest of Kabul.
- 672: Capture of the island of Rhodes. Muslims invade Khurasan.
- 674: The Muslims cross the Oxus. Bukhara becomes a vassal state.
- 676: Muhammad al-Baqir, the fifth imam of the Shiites is born.
- 677: Occupation of Samarkand and Tirmiz. Siege of Constantinople.
- 680: 28 April – Death of Muawiyah. Yazid I becomes caliph.
- 680: 10 October – Battle of Karbala and Husayn bin Ali is killed along with his companions. Ali ibn Husayn becomes Imam of Ali ibn Abi Talib's followers.
- 682: North Africa Uqba bin Nafe marches to the Atlantic, is ambushed and killed at Biskra. The Muslims evacuate Kairouan and withdraw to Burqa.
- 683: 11 November – Death of Yazid I. Muawiya II becomes caliph.
- 684: June – Muawiya II abdicated.
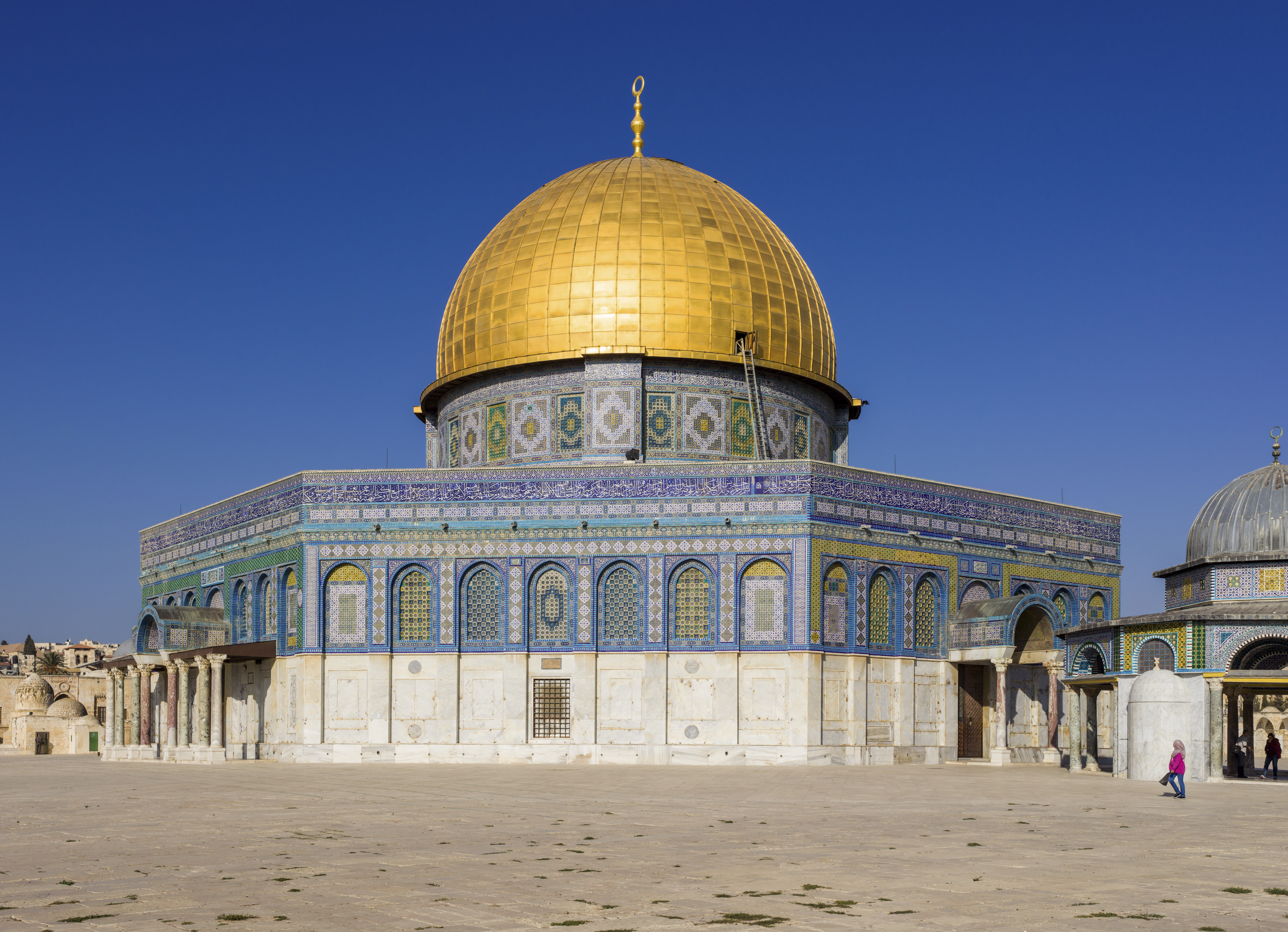
  View of the Dome of the Rock built between 685 and 692 by Umayyad caliph Abd al-Malik, Jerusalem, Palestine.
- 684: Abd Allah ibn Zubayr declares himself as the caliph at Mecca. Marwan I becomes the caliph at Damascus. Battle of Marj Rahit.
- 685: Death of Marwan I. Abd al-Malik becomes the caliph at Damascus. Battle of 'Ayn al-Warda.
- 686: Al-Mukhtar declares himself as the caliph at Kufa.
- 687: Battle of Kufa between the forces of Mukhtar and Abd Allah ibn Zubayr. Mukhtar killed.
- 691: Battle of Maskin. Kufa falls to Abd al-Malik.
- 692: October – The fall of Mecca. Death of ibn Zubayr. Abdul Malik becomes the sole caliph.
- 695: Kharijites' revolts in Jazira and Ahwaz. Battle of the Karun. Muslims wage war against Kahina in North Africa. The Muslims once again withdraw to Barqa. They advance in Transoxiana and occupy Kish.
- 700: Muslims proselytised the pagan Berbers in North Africa and convert most of them to Islam in a short period of time. By the end of this century, the global Muslim population had grown to 1 percent of the total.

== See also ==
- Canonization of Islamic scripture
- Early Muslim conquests
- Early social changes under Islam
- Timeline of early Islamic history

== Bibliography ==
- Hawting, G. R (2002). The First Dynasty of Islam: The Umayyad Caliphate AD 661-750. Routledge. ISBN 978-1-134-55059-3.
