= Battle of the River =

633 CE conflict during the Islamic conquest of Persia

- Part of Islamic conquest of Persia and Campaigns of Khalid ibn al-Walid
Date	April 633
Location	Mesopotamia (Asoristan Province)
Result	Rashidun Caliphate victory

Belligerents
Rashidun Caliphate	Sasanian Empire

Commanders and leaders
Khalid ibn al-Walid	Karen †; Kavad †; Anoshegan †

Strength
17,000	Unknown

Casualties and losses
Very low	30,000 (Note: Akram cites al-Tabari for Sasanid casualty figure.)

The Battle of the River, also known as Battle of Al Madhar, took place in Mesopotamia (Asoristan Province) between the forces of the Rashidun Caliphate and the Sasanian Empire. Muslims, under Khalid ibn al-Walid's command, defeated the numerically superior Sasanian army.

== Prelude ==
The Islamic prophet Muhammad died on 8 June 632, and Abu Bakr succeeded him as first Caliph. Abu Bakr's Caliphate lasted for 27 months, during which he crushed the rebellion of the Arab tribes throughout Arabia in the successful campaign against apostasy and restored the authority of Medina over Arabia. Once the rebellions had been put down, Abu Bakr began a war of conquest. He launched campaigns against the Sassanid Empire and the Byzantine Empire (Eastern Roman Empire) and thus set in motion a historical trajectory that in just a few short decades would lead to one of the largest empires in history.

After the Ridda Wars, a Muslim tribal chief raided the Persian frontier towns in Iraq. After the success of these raids Abu Bakr planned to expand his empire. He started with Iraq, a rich Persian province. After centuries of Persian power and glory, it was important for Abu Bakr's expedition not to suffer a defeat, for that would confirm and strengthen the fear for the Persian military strength. To overcome these concerns he decided that the army that would invade Persia would consist entirely of volunteers. He put in command of the army his best general Khalid ibn al-Walid. Muslims invaded the Sassanid Persian Empire in April 633 and defeated the Sassanid army in the Battle of Chains, where the Marzbān (provincial governor) Hormuz was killed by Khalid ibn al-Walid in a duel.

== Background ==
Before the Battle of Chains, the Marzbān Hormuz wrote to the emperor about the threat from Arabia and concentrated an army for the battle, consisting of a large number of Christian Arab auxiliaries, and before the battle the emperor sent a big army led by a top-ranking general by the name of Qarin, his role was to protect Uballa which was an important port of the Persian Empire in case the Muslims defeated Marzbān Hormuz.

== Battle preparation ==
=== Persian preparation ===
After the Battle of Chains the force of the Persian army led by the officers commanding the wings Qubaz and Anoshagan joined Karinz's army. Survivors from the Battle of Chains had informed commanding officers of how Persian veterans had abandoned them and joined the Muslim forces allowing the Muslims to fill up their lines with experienced Persian veterans who converted to Islam and would face inexperienced conscripts, the idea would lead many to abandon the cause and return home. Karinz panicked and chose to fight out of Uballa in a place called Al Madhar, knowing the Persian veterans who had converted to Islam would not know the area. Karinz chose this place because it was near the Euphrates River making it easier for the Persian regulars to arrive with ease.

=== Muslim preparation ===
Khalid knew that the Persians had organised their army in Al Madhar, so he led the army, and sent a small detachment led by Al-Muthanna ibn Haritha. The aim was to arrive before the Persian forces could gather their strength and strike them whilst weak and unprepared, like most battles this tactic would allow Khalid to exploit and execute many maneuvers before experienced armies could react. When Khalid arrived, he saw Persian ships still arriving at the edge of the river, and immediately understood that the Persian Army was still unprepared and not ready for battle. The Arab aim was to strike before the more experienced veterans would arrive.

== Battle ==
Khalid faced the Persians with about 17,000 men. The two armies formed up for battle. Qubaz and Anushjan commanded the wings of Persian army while Qarin who was 100,000 dirhams General, kept the centre. Persian army was deployed with the river close behind it with fleets of boats ready at the near bank to facilitate withdrawal. Khalid also deployed with the centre and wings, again appointing Asim bin Amr and Adi bin Hatim as the commanders of the wings.

The battle began with three duels. The first to step forward and call out a challenge was Qarin. As Khalid urged his horse forward, another Muslim Maqal bin Al Ashi, rode out of the Muslim front rank and made for Qarin. Maqal reached Qarin before Khalid and since he was an accomplished swordsman and quite able to fight in the top-class champions, Khalid did not call him back. They fought and Maqal killed Qarin. Afterwards, the other two generals, Qubaz and Anushjan came forward and gave the challenge for single combat. The challenge was accepted by the commanders of the Muslim wings, Asim and Adi. Asim killed Anushjan and Adi killed Qabuz. As the Persian generals fell, Khalid gave the order for a general attack and the Muslims rushed forward to assault the massed Persian army.

The Persian army here now lost all the top generals, yet the men fought bravely and were able to hold the Muslim attacks for a while. But because of the absence of able generals, disorder and confusion soon became apparent in the Persian ranks. Eventually, under the continued Muslim attacks, the Persian army lost all cohesion, turned about and made for the river bank. 30,000 Persians were killed in this battle.

== Aftermath ==
After the Battle of River, Khalid defeated the Persian armies in three more battles (battle of Walaja – battle of Ullais – battle of Hira) and captured his objective: Al-Hirah. The first Muslim invasion of Iraq was completed within four months. Abu Bakr didn't direct Khalid to move deeper into the Sassanid territory, and after nine months he sent him to command the invasion of Byzantine Empire on the Syrian front.

== Sources ==
- Morony, M. (2012). "ARAB ii. Arab conquest of Iran". Encyclopaedia Iranica. "This victory enabled Ḵāled to penetrate the lower line of Sasanian frontier defenses near the coast and invade Maysān, where he defeated the survivors of Hormoz's army and reinforcements from al-Madāʾen at the battle of Maḏār in Ṣafar, 12/March-April, 633."
- Akram, A.I. (1970). The Sword of Allah: Khalid bin al-Waleed, His Life and Campaigns. Nat. Publishing. House. ISBN 0-7101-0104-X.
