= Battle of Walaja =

633 battle between Rashidun Caliphate and Sassanid Empire

- Part of the Islamic conquest of Persia; Campaigns of Khalid ibn al-Walid
- Map showing the region in Iraq where Battle of Walaja was fought.
Date	May 633
Location	Mesopotamia
Result	Rashidun Caliphate victory

Belligerents
Rashidun Caliphate	Sasanian Empire, Christian Arab allies

Commanders and leaders
Khalid ibn al-Walid; Al-Muthanna ibn Haritha	Andarzaghar †; Bahman Jadhuyih

Strength
15,000	15,000–30,000

Casualties and losses
~2,000+	20,000

The Battle of Walaja (Arabic: معركة الولجة) was fought in Mesopotamia in May 633 between the Rashidun Caliphate army under Khalid ibn al-Walid and Al-Muthanna ibn Haritha against the Sassanid Empire and its Arab allies.

Khalid defeated the Sasanian forces by using a variation of the double envelopment tactical manoeuvre, similar to the manoeuvre that Hannibal had used to defeat the Roman forces at the Battle of Cannae.

== Prelude ==
The Islamic prophet Muhammad died on 8 June 632, Abu Bakr succeeded him as first Caliph. Abu Bakr's Caliphate lasted for 27 months, during which he crushed the rebellion of the Arab tribes throughout Arabia in the successful campaign against Apostasy, and restored the authority of Madinah over Arabia. Once the rebellions had been put down, Abu Bakr realized that the Sassanid Empire and the Byzantine Empire both threatened the borders of the nascent Muslim state and that passiveness would only lead to invasion. He therefore launched campaigns against the Sasanian Empire and the Byzantine Empire, setting in motion a historical trajectory that in just a few decades would lead to one of the largest empires in history.

After the Ridda Wars a Muslim tribal chief raided the Persian frontier towns in Iraq. After the success of these raids, Abu Bakr planned to expand his empire. He started with Iraq, which was under Sassanid occupation at the time. It was important for Abu Bakr that his expedition did not suffer a defeat, for that would confirm and strengthen the fear of Sassanid military strength. To overcome these concerns, he decided that the army that would battle the Persians would consist entirely of volunteers. He put in command of the army his best general, Khalid ibn al-Walid.

The Muslims invaded the Sassanid Persian Empire in April 633, and defeated the Sassanid army in two consecutive battles: the Battle of Chains and the Battle of River. Khalid's basic plan was to inflict as many casualties on the Persians as possible. Also, to meet as little resistance as possible along the route of his advance, with the objective of capturing Al-Hira.

== Concentration of Sassanid armies ==
After the Battle of River, the Rashidun Caliphate army under Khalid once again set out for Hira; meanwhile the news of the defeat at the Battle of River reached Ctesiphon. The commanders of the defeated Persian armies were said to be some of the most experienced and most highly regarded figures at the Sassanid court. The Sassanian Emperor, Yazdegerd III ordered the concentration of another two armies.

Following the orders of Yazdegerd III, Sassanid forces began to gather at the imperial capital. They came from all towns and garrisons except those manning the western frontier with the Byzantine Empire. In a few days the first army was ready. The Sassanid court expected the Muslims to proceed along the Euphrates to North-Western Iraq, as they knew that the Muslim force would not move away from the desert, which they were expected to use to retreat to, in case of defeat. Expecting the Muslim army to move west, Yazdegerd III picked Walaja as the place at which to stop Khalid ibn al-Walid and destroy his army. The first of the new Sassanid armies raised at Ctesiphon was placed under the command of Andarzaghar, governor of Khurasan province. Andarzaghar was ordered to move his army to Walaja, where he would soon be joined by the second army. He set off from Ctesiphon, moved along the east bank of the Tigris, crossed the Tigris at Kaškar, moved south-west to the Euphrates, near Walaja, crossed the Euphrates and established his camp at Walaja.

On his way to Walaja, the Persian general picked up thousands of Arabs who were willing to fight under his standard. He had also taken command of the remnants of the army that had fought in the Battles of River and Chains. When he arrived at Walaja he waited for Bahman, who was to join him in a few days. Bahman was the commander of the second army, and one of the top personalities of the Sassanid military hierarchy. He was ordered by the Emperor to take the second army to Walaja, where Andarzaghar would await him. The plan was for Bahman to be the commander of both the armies, and annihilate the outnumbered Rashidun army in one great battle. Bahman moved on a separate route to that of Andarzaghar's. From Ctesiphon, he marched south between the two rivers, heading directly for Walaja, but he left Ctesiphon several days after the first army started marching, causing delays.

== Preparation of the Muslim army ==
The Battle of River had been an important victory for the Muslims. While having only sustained minor casualties, the Muslims had been able to defeat a large Sassanid army and to acquire a vast amount of booty. By now Khalid had organised an efficient network of intelligence agents. The agents were local Arabs who were hostile to the Persians. The agents informed Khalid about the concentration of new Sassanid armies in the area of Walaja and their much greater numbers. Khalid had to get to Hira, and Walaja was directly on his route.

With an army of about 15,000 men, Khalid set off in the direction of Hira, moving at a fast pace along the southern edge of the great marsh. A few days before Bahman was expected, Khalid's army arrived and camped a short distance from Walaja. Great numbers of Sassanian Persians who had fled from earlier battles took up arms again. The survivors of the Battle of Chains joined Qarin and fought at the Battle of River. The survivors of the Battle of River joined Andarzaghar and were now encamped at Walaja. The Muslims faced two challenges, one strategic and one tactical:

1. The strategic: Two Sassanid armies were about to combine to oppose them. To solve this problem, the Muslim commander-in-chief, Khalid ibn Walid, determined to advance rapidly, fight, and eliminate one army (Andarzaghar's) before the other army (Bahman's) arrived on the scene.
2. The tactical: Prevent enemy warriors from escaping the battlefield to regroup and continue fighting. To accomplish this, Khalid's plan was to trap and annihilate the Sassanid army on the battlefield.

Khalid gave instructions to Suwaid bin Muqarrin to see to the administration of the conquered districts with his team of officials, and posted detachments to guard the lower Tigris against possible enemy crossings from the north and east, and to give warning of any fresh enemy forces coming from those directions.

== Troop deployment ==
Battle of Walaja

The battlefield consisted of an even plain stretching between two low, flat ridges, which were about 2 miles apart and 20 to 30 feet in height. The northeastern part of the plain ran into a barren desert. A short distance beyond the northeastern ridge flowed a branch of the Euphrates, then also known as the River Khaseef. In May 633, the armies deployed for battle, each with a centre and wings. The Muslim wings were again commanded by Asim bin Amr and Addi bin hatim.

The Sassanid commander, Andarzaghar, deployed in the centre of this plain, facing south-east, with the western ridge behind them, and their left resting on the northeastern ridge. Khalid formed his army facing the Sassanid army. The center of the battlefield was about two miles southeast of present, Ain-ul-Muhari, 35 miles southeast of present, Najaf, and six miles southeast of present Ash Sinafiyah.

The Sassanid cavalry was heavily outnumbered by the Muslim cavalry. It was mainly composed of heavy cavalry and was stationed behind the wings, guarding the flanks.

Khalid had 5,000 cavalry and 10,000 infantry with him. Knowing that his cavalry outnumbered the Persian cavalry, he designed his grand manoeuvre. His plan was the total encirclement of the Persian army using his superior cavalry. Rather than launching his cavalry via the flanks (as Hannibal had done in the Battle of Cannae), Khalid made use of the terrain, and positioned a part of the cavalry behind the western ridge of the battlefield. Khalid divided his cavalry into two regiments of about 2,000 men each, sending them behind the western ridge the night before the battle. They were instructed to attack the Persian rear at Khalid's signal.

== Battle ==
Khalid faced the Sassanids with about 5,000 cavalry and 10,000 infantry. Cavalry were divided into two equal divisions and deployed at the flanks. The strategy of the Persian commander in chief, Andarzaghar, was to go on the defensive and let the Muslims charge first. He planned to hold off their attacks until they were worn out, then launch a counter-attack to rout the weary Muslim army. The first phase of the battle went according to Andarzaghar's plan. Khalid ordered a general attack. The Sassanid army had reserves which they employed to replace their men in the front line, giving them the upper hand over the Muslim army and helping them to carry out their scheme to wear out their opponents. During this time, Khalid is said to have duelled with a Persian champion of gigantic proportions known as Hazar Mard (A Thousand Men) and killed him, which was a psychological victory for the Muslims.

With the first phase over, the second phase began with the counter-attack of the Sassanid Persian army. Perhaps seeing signs of fatigue from the Muslim soldiers, Andarzaghar judged that this was the right moment for his counter-attack. At his command, the Sassanians, supported by the Persian heavy cavalry, carried out a general attack on the Muslim front. The Arabs were able to hold them off for some time, but the Persians pressed on. On Khalid’s instructions the Muslim centre started retreating slowly and in order while the wings held the ground. This created a crescent-shaped front, allowing more and more Persian troops inside the formation.

At this moment, Khalid gave a signal to his cavalry and they charged the Persian flanks. The two Rashidun light cavalry ambushing forces led by Dhiraar ibn al-Azwar and Suwaid ibn Muqarrin charged at incredible speed and struck the rear of the Persians. This mobility gave them an upper hand on the Sassanid heavy cavalry, resulting in a rout of the Persian cavalry. They attacked the flanks and rear of the Persian army and started encircling it. The main body of the Muslim army under Khalid ibn al-Walid resumed the attack against the Persian front, while at the same time extending its flanks to join with the cavalry and completely surround the Sassanids. The army of Andarzaghar was caught in a trap and could not escape. Recoiling from the assaults that came from all directions, the Sassanid army gathered in an unwieldy mass, unable to use their weapons freely. The battle was over, with heavy casualties inflicted on the Sassanid army. Nevertheless, a few thousand imperial soldiers managed to escape. Although Andarzaghar escaped Khalid’s encirclement, he got lost in the desert and died later out of thirst.

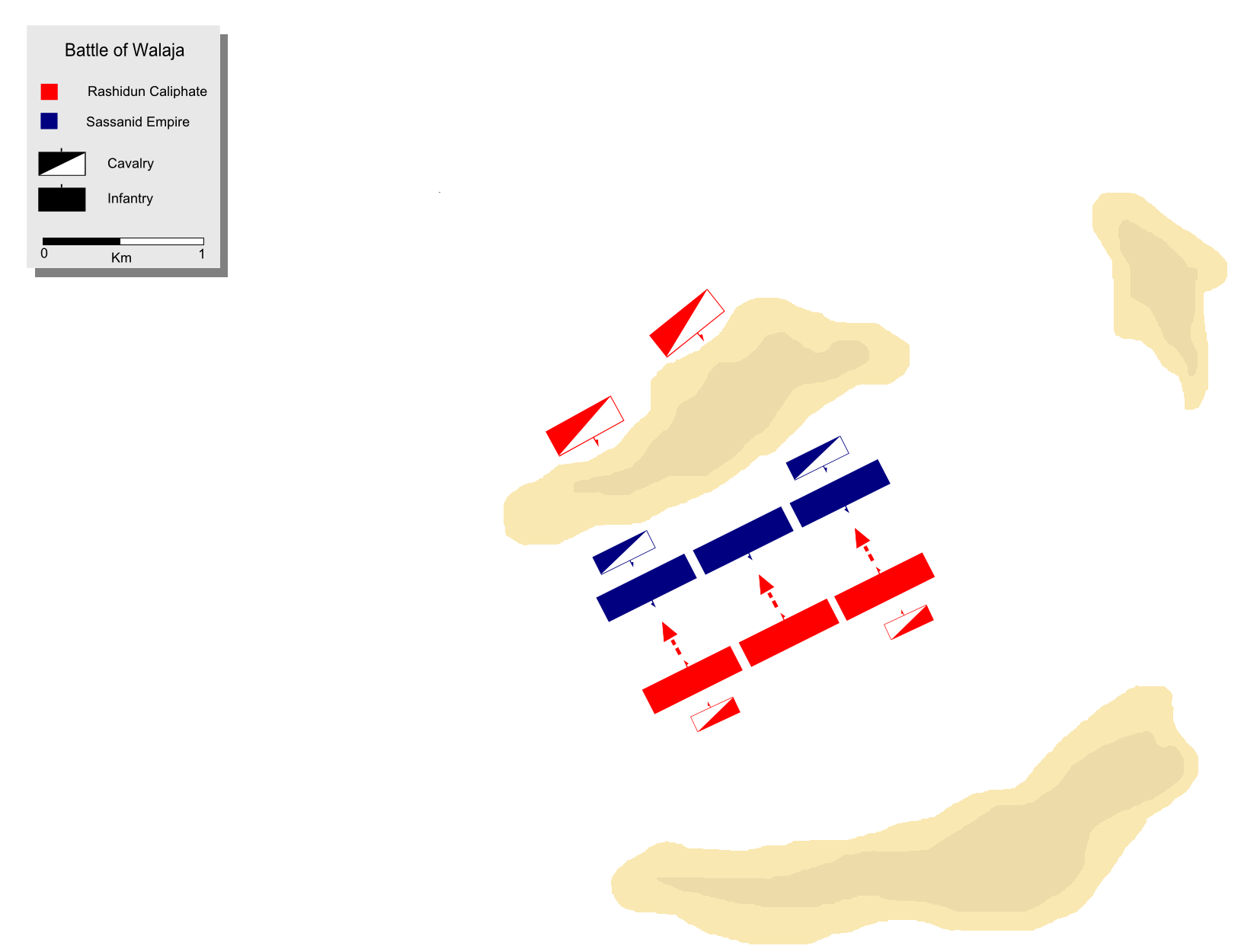
Phase-1: Khalid launches a general attack on the Sassanid army.

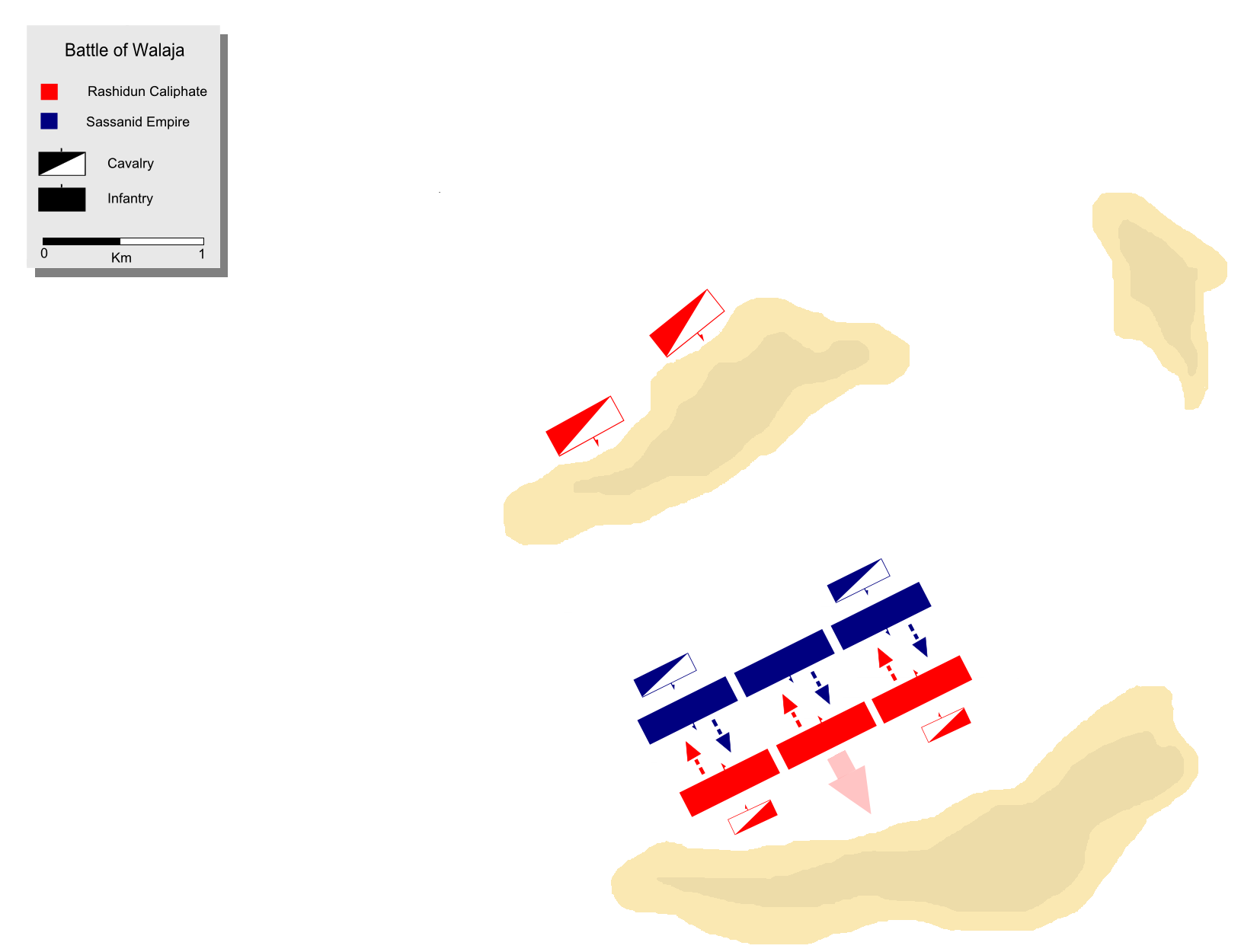
Phase-2: Sassanids launch a counter-attack. On Khalid's instructions, the Muslim centre began a slow and orderly retreated, luring the Persian army inside the formation.

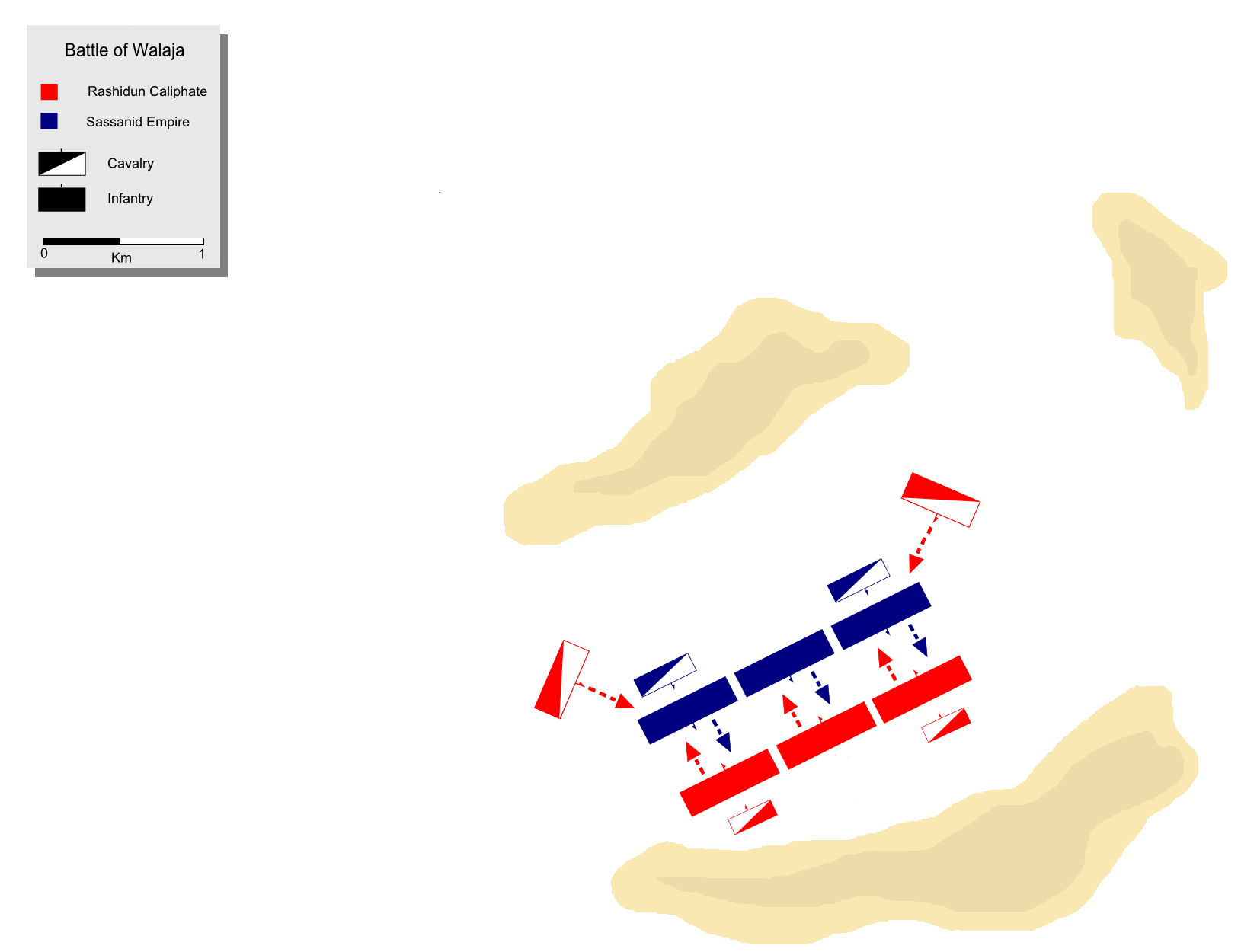
Muslim cavalry attack the Persian flank and rear, routing the Persian cavalry.

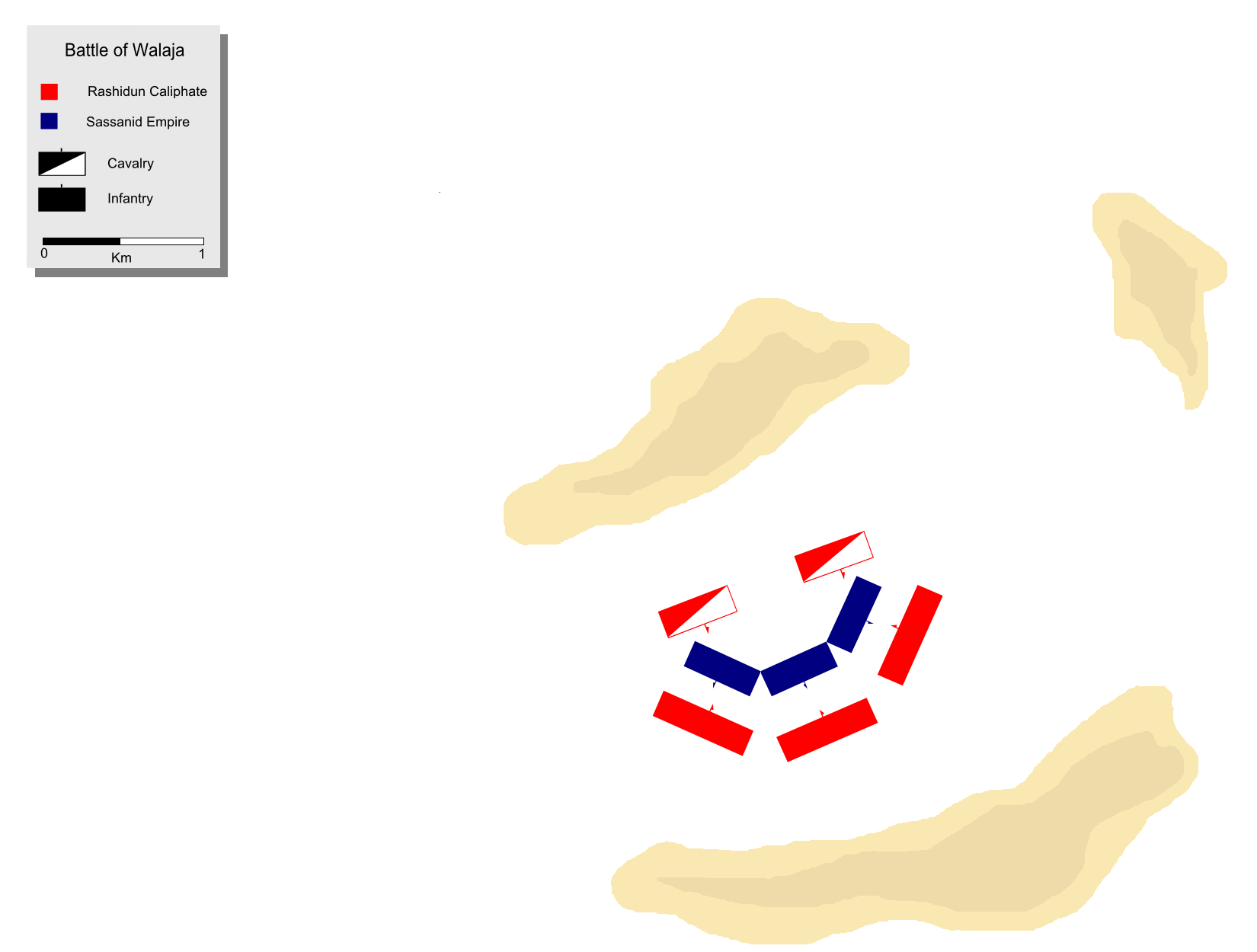
Muslim cavalry and infantry complete the encirclement of the Persian army.

== Aftermath ==
After annihilating another army of the Sassanid Persians and their Christian Arab allies at the final Battle of Ullais, the Muslims conquered Hira, the capital city of Mesopotamia in late May 633. Later followed the conquest of Al-Anbar and the successful siege of Ein-al-Tamr. With the fall of the main cities the whole of Southern and Central Iraq, with the exception of Ctesiphon, came under Muslim control. In 634, Abu Bakr ordered Khalid ibn Walid to proceed to Syria with half of his army to command the invasion of the Byzantine Empire. Al-Muthanna bin Harith Al-Shaibani was left as the successor of Khalid. The Sassanids, under their new emperor Yazdgerd III, raised new armies and defeated the Muslims in the Battle of the Bridge, regaining some lost ground in Iraq. The second invasion of Iraq was undertaken under Sa`d ibn Abī Waqqās who, after defeating the Sassanid army at the Battle of al-Qādisiyyah in 636, captured Ctesiphon. After the Battle of Nihawand in 641 a whole scale invasion of the Persian Empire was carried out by Caliph Umar.

== Sources ==
- Akram, Agha Ibrahim (1970), The Sword of Allah: Khalid bin al-Waleed - His Life and Campaigns, Oxford University Press: Pakistan, ISBN 0-19-597714-9
- Ahmed, Mufti M. Mukarram (2005), Encyclopaedia of Islam, Anmol Publications PVT. LTD: Pakistan, ISBN 81-261-2339-7
- Muir, Sir William (1898), The Caliphate, its rise, decline, and fall: from original sources, Smith, Elder publishers
- Yar-Shater, Ehsan (1982), Encyclopaedia Iranica, Volume 3, Routledge & Kegan Paul publishers
- Sykes, Sir Percy Molesworth (1915), A history of Persia, Volume 1, Macmillan and co. limited.
- Jaques, Tony (2006), Dictionary of Battles And Sieges: A Guide to 8,500 Battles from Antiquity Through the Twenty-first Century, Greenwood Publishing Group, ISBN 0-313-33536-2
