= Andarzaghar =

Andarzaghar was a 7th-century Sasanian general who fought against the Muslims during the Islamic invasion of Iran. A native of Asoristan, he belonged to a lower rank of land-owning magnates (dehqan) who were centered around the villages and rural subdistricts of the province. He was originally in charge of protecting the borders of Khorasan, but was ordered by the Sasanian king to protect the western frontiers from the Arabs who were conquering Persia. In 633, Andarzaghar, along with Bahman Jadhuyih, with an army composed of Iranians and Christian Arabs, made a counter-attack against the army of Khalid ibn al-Walid at the Walaja, but were defeated. Andarzaghar then fled, and died of thirst in the desert.

== Sources ==
- Morony, Michael G. (2005) [1984]. Iraq After The Muslim Conquest. Gorgias Press LLC. ISBN 978-1-59333-315-7.
- Pourshariati, Parvaneh (2008). Decline and Fall of the Sasanian Empire: The Sasanian-Parthian Confederacy and the Arab Conquest of Iran. London and New York: I.B. Tauris. ISBN 978-1-84511-645-3.
- Zarrinkub, Abd al-Husain (1975). "The Arab conquest of Iran and its aftermath". The Cambridge History of Iran, Volume 4: From the Arab Invasion to the Saljuqs. Cambridge: Cambridge University Press. pp. 1–57. ISBN 978-0-521-20093-6.
