= Bahman Jaduya =

7th-century Sasanian general

Bahman Jādūya
- بهمن جادویه
- Born: Unknown
- Died: November 636 al-Qadisiyyah
- Military career
- Allegiance: Sasanian Empire
- Branch: Sasanian army
- Conflicts: Muslim conquest of Iran; Battle of the Bridge; Battle of al-Qadisiyyah †

Bahman Jādhūyah/Jādūyah (also Jādhōē/Jādōē; New Persian: بهمن جادویه), or Bahman Jādhawayh (Middle Persian: Vahūman Ĵādaggōw) was an Iranian general of the Sasanians. He is mostly known to have led the Sasanians to victory against the Arab Muslims at the Battle of the Bridge. The Arab Muslims referred to Bahman as Dhul Hājib ("owner of bushy eyebrows"). He had a reputation for being anti-Arab. He is often confused with Mardanshah, another Sasanian general.

== Biography ==
Little is known about the early life of Bahman Jaduya (Middle Persian: Vahūman Jādaggōw; Persian: بهمن جادویه, also transliterated Bahman Jādhūyah, Bahman Jādhawayh). Some sources identify him as the son of the Sasanian general Hormozd Jadhuyih. By the 630s he was described as an older commander and a leading member of the Parsig (Persian) faction at court, led by Piruz Khosrow.

During this period the Sasanian Empire was weakened by internal rivalries while facing early Arab incursions into Mesopotamia (Sawad) .

== Military career ==
Campaigns before the Battle of the Bridge

In 633 CE the Sasanian monarch ordered Andarzaghar, commander of the eastern front in Khorasan, to defend the western frontier against Arab raids. That same year, Andarzaghar and Bahman Jaduya jointly confronted Khalid ibn al-Walid at the Battle of Walaja, but the Sasanian army was defeated. Bahman withdrew to Ctesiphon, where the young king Yazdegerd III—then ill—commanded him to launch a counterattack. Instead, Bahman delegated the task to his subordinate Jābān, whose independent engagement at the Battle of Ullais also ended in defeat.

Battle of the Bridge (634 CE)

When the Arab general Abu Ubaid al-Thaqafi advanced into Suwād, the chief Sasanian commander Rostam Farrokhzād sent Bahman Jaduya and Jalinus to confront him with a force drawn from the powerful Wuzurgān noble class, including elite Zhayedān units and war elephants. Rostam reportedly instructed Bahman: “If Jalinus again returns defeated, cut off his head.”

The two armies met on the Euphrates River near Marwaha (southern Iraq). The elephants terrified the Arabs’ horses, turning the battle in favor of the Sasanians. Abu Ubaid was killed, and roughly 4 000 Arabs drowned or were slain. This engagement—known as the Battle of the Bridge—became the only early major confrontation of the Arab-Sasanian wars ending in a decisive Sasanian victory. Bahman did not pursue the survivors, possibly because of unrest in Ctesiphon or logistical constraints.

Death at the Battle of al-Qadisiyyah (636 CE)

Two years later, during the Battle of al-Qadisiyyah, Bahman again commanded Sasanian forces. According to al-Tabari, he was slain in single combat by Qaʿqāʿ ibn ʿAmr al-Tamimi, who sought vengeance for Abu Ubaid’s death at the Bridge. Bahman’s death severely demoralized the Sasanian troops and contributed to the army’s collapse, marking a decisive stage in the Muslim conquest of Iran.

== Title and confusion with Mardanshah ==
Arabic sources often refer to Bahman as Dhul-Hājib (“the one with thick eyebrows”), though this may represent an official court rank rather than a nickname. Medieval chroniclers such as al-Tabari and Balʿami sometimes conflated Bahman with another general, Mardanshah, who also bore the title Dhul-Hājib. Modern scholars including Theodor Nöldeke consider Dhul-Hājib likely to have been a Sasanian military title rather than a personal epithet.

== Legacy ==
Bahman Jaduya’s victory at the Bridge was one of the final significant triumphs of Sasanian arms before the empire’s downfall. His death at Qadisiyyah came to symbolize the decline of the Sasanian military elite. Later Persian historiography remembered him as a valiant yet tragic commander, emblematic of Iran’s last stand before Islam.

== Sources ==
- Morony, M. (2016) [1988]. "Bahman Jādūya". In Yarshater, Ehsan (ed.). Encyclopædia Iranica (Online ed.). Encyclopædia Iranica Foundation.
- Pourshariati, Parvaneh (2008-03-30). Decline and Fall of the Sasanian Empire: The Sasanian-Parthian Confederacy and the Arab Conquest of Iran. London; New York : New York: I. B. Tauris. ISBN 978-1-84511-645-3.
- Zarrinkub, Abd al-Husain (1975). "The Arab Conquest of Iran and Its Aftermath". In Frye, R. N. (ed.). The Cambridge History of Iran. Vol. 4 From the Arab Invasion to the Saljuqs. Cambridge: Cambridge University Press. ISBN 978-0-521-20093-6.
