= Battle of Ullais =

Part of Muslim conquest of Mesopotamia

- Part of Muslim conquest of Persia
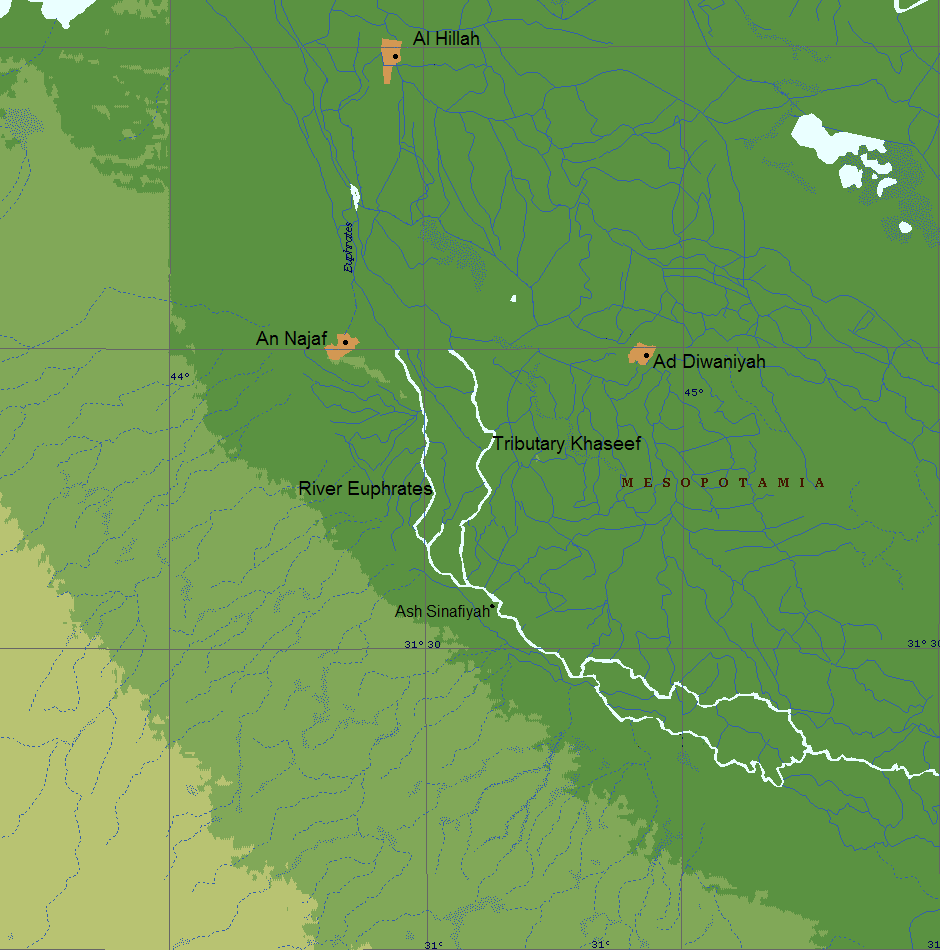
- Overview of the region where the Battle of Ullais was fought, showing the river Euphrates and its tributary the Khaseef (Iraq)
Date	May 633 A.D.
Location	Sasanian Mesopotamia 31°37′04″N 44°34′11″E
Result	Rashidun victory

Belligerents
Rashidun Caliphate	Sasanian Empire; Arab allies

Commanders and leaders
Khalid ibn al-Walid; Al-Muthanna ibn Haritha	Jaban; Abdul-Aswad †; Abjar †

Strength
18,000	70,000 (Arab estimates); 30,000 (modern estimation)

Casualties and losses
~2,000	70,000 killed (Primary Arab sources)
- Location within Iraq

The Battle of Ullais (Arabic: معركة أليس) was fought between the forces of the Rashidun Caliphate and the Sasanian Persian Empire in the middle of June 633 AD in Iraq, and is sometimes referred to as the Battle of Blood River since, as a result of the battle, there were enormous amounts of Persian Sasanian and Arab Christian casualties.

This was now the last of four consecutive battles that were fought between invading Muslims and the Persian army. After each battle the Persians and their allies regrouped and fought again. These battles resulted in the retreat of the Sasanian Persian army from Iraq and its capture by Muslims under the Rashidun Caliphate.

== Background ==
Before taking on the Persians, Khalid ibn al-Walid wrote to Hormuz, the Persian governor of the frontier district of Dast Meisan, saying:

Submit to Islam and be safe. Or agree to the payment of the Jizya, and you and your people will be under our protection, else you will have only yourself to blame for the consequences, for I bring the men who desire death as ardently as you desire life.

After their defeat at the Battle of Walaja, the Sassanid survivors of the battle who consisted mostly of Christian Arabs fled from the battlefield, crossed the River Khaseef (a tributary of the Euphrates) and moved between it and the Euphrates. Their flight ended at Ullais, about 10 miles from the location of the Battle of Walaja. The Muslims were aware of the presence of hostile Arabs at Ullais but, as they were less numerous and were survivors of Walaja, they never considered them a military threat until they started to regroup and the Muslim commander Khalid ibn Walid was informed about the arrival of more Arab hordes, mainly from the Christian Arab tribe of Bani Bakr. More reinforcements were raised from the Christian Arab tribes in the region between Al-Hirah and Ullais. The Rashidun Caliphate army under Khalid crossed the river Khaseef and approached Ullais frontally. Emperor Ardsheer meanwhile sent orders to Bahman Jaduya to proceed to Ullais and take command of Arab contingents there and stop the Muslims' advance at Ullais. Bahman sent his senior general Jaban with the imperial army to Ullais with orders to avoid battle until Bahman Jaduya himself arrived. As Jaban set off with the army, Bahman Jaduya returned to Ctesiphon to discuss certain matters with the Emperor. He arrived at Ctesiphon to find Emperor Ardsheer very ill and remained in attendance on him. By now the Persians and Arabs had realised that the Muslims' objective was Al-Hirah. They decided to fight and defeat the Muslim army. The Christian Arab contingents were under the command of a tribal chief called Abdul-Aswad, who had lost his two sons in the Battle of Walaja against the Muslims and wanted revenge.

== The battle ==
One of the Muslim commanders, Al-Muthanna ibn Haritha, advanced with the light cavalry scouts to the Ullais and informed the Muslim commander-in-chief Khalid ibn Walid of the location of the hostile Arabs. Khalid tried to reach Ullais before the Sasanian army could reinforce them, in order to avoid a battle with an army that would have heavily outnumbered his own; however he failed to do so. In order to deny the Persians time to organize and to coordinate their plans, Khalid decided to fight the battle that very same day.

According to modern geography the battlefield lies 25 miles south-east of the Iraqi city of Najaf, and about 4 miles south-west of modern Ash Shinafiyah.

The Sassanid army and Christian Arabs contingents were camped side by side with the Euphrates to their left, the Khaseef to their right, and the river junction behind them. Muslim commander-in-chief Khalid ibn Walid arrayed his army in battle formation, appointing Adi ibn Hatim (who was a son of the famous Arab Christian leader Hatim At Tai and a former Christian) as commander of the right wing and Asim ibn Umar commander of the left wing. Information of the Rashidun Caliphate army's advance reached Jaban a little before midday. It was mealtime and the Persian soldiers were to take their meal, but the Sasanian troops abstained from food so as to "display their toughness" to the Muslims.

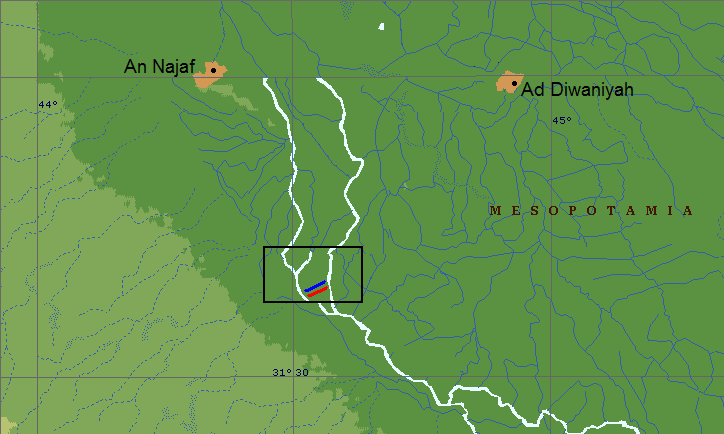
The site of the Battle of Ullais, showing Muslim army (in red) and Sassanid army (in blue).

Jaban arranged the Sassanid army in great haste before the Muslims could arrive, appointing the Christian Arabs to form the wings of his army, with the tribal chief Abdul-Aswad commanding the right wing and the tribal chief Abjar commanding the left wing. The center was formed by the Imperial army. The battlefield ran south-east of Ullais between the Euphrates and Khaseef. The Persian army was deployed with its back to Ullais, while in front of it was arrayed the Rashidun Caliphate army. The northern flank of both armies rested on the Euphrates and their southern flank on the river Khaseef, a distance of about 2 miles.

Details of the manoeuvres used by Khalid are not recorded by history. Muslim commander in chief Khalid ibn al-Walid killed the Christian Arab tribal chief Abdul-Aswad in a duel. The fighting was heaviest on the bank of the Khaseef. It is mentioned in Muslim chronicles that If ever an army meant to fight it out to the last, it was the imperial army of Ullais. The fierce battle continued for hours; no signs of weakness were shown on either side.

Early in the afternoon the Sassanid Persian army and Arab allies, unable to withstand the veteran Muslim army, finally retreated to the north-west in the direction of Al-Hirah.

Against the Persians and their allies, Khalid ibn al-Walid had always been heavily inferior in number but understood the concept of desert warfare and when threatened, his men, who were used to the harsh desert conditions, would withdraw into the desert, where they could not be pursued. The Arab camels drank water less frequently than the Persian horses. Khalid also used the desert for his camel supply line.

Arab tribes were the only ones who could interfere with his strategy and defeat him from the rear by disrupting his supply line and stopping his escape routes. Khalid ibn al-Walid feared that these Arab tribes would regroup, others will also get bribed by the Persians and attack his supply line and close off his escape routes. He also feared that the Persians would regroup and attack his front. They had already fought him in three battles and after each battle regrouped.

=== The "River of Blood" ===
The Islamic historian Tabari states that upon being unable to make a breakthrough the defensive lines of the Sassanians, Khalid had prayed to Allah and promised that he would flow rivers of blood of the Sassanid forces if he won the battle. The Sassanids started fleeing towards Al-Hirah in front of a renewed vigorous assault by the Muslims. Thousands were killed with the bank of the river turning red from the amount of dead.

Khalid Ibn Walid ordered some of his men to publicly announce that the defeated Persians were to be captured, not killed—unless they fought back. Group after group gave themselves up and were brought to Khalid who assigned some of his men to behead them all alongside the bank of the river. This continued for a day and a night. Over the next two days, he pursued the fleeing Persian soldiers until they found themselves cornered by the rivers. They were then all beheaded. When he saw that the blood was congealing on the soil instead of flowing, on the advice of Qa'qa ibn Amr, one of the commanders of the Muslim army, Khalid ordered the dam on the river to be opened, and the water then flowed in and moved mills, then they made bread with that which fed his troops of 18,000 for three days, thus fulfilling his earlier oath about running the river with blood and it became known as the "River of Blood".

This episode is not mentioned by any other early Islamic accounts including the historian Al-Baladhuri. While the Muslims had no name for the river in which the Persians were beheaded, Agha Ibrahim Akram identified it with the Khaseef or Khasif river, a tributary of the Euphrates. The Cambridge History of Iran adds that the legend is also attributed to other Arab commanders.

== Aftermath ==
Over 70,000 Sassanids lost their lives in the battle, including those beheaded in the river of Ullais on Khalid's order. However modern historian Peter Crawford estimated the real number of the Sassanid army to be around 30,000 Persians only and the number of 70,000 is the result of exaggeration. The Sasanian commander Jaban however escaped. After the battle, Khalid imposed the jizyah (tax on non-Muslims) on the civilians of Ullais and mandated them to act as spies among the Iranians.

Khalid gave a tribute to the Sassanid Persian army. He said:

At Mutah I broke nine swords in my hand. But I have never met an enemy like the Persians. And among the Persians I have never met an enemy like the army of Ullais.

Afterwards, Khalid besieged the city of Al-Hirah, the regional capital city of lower Mesopotamia, in the Battle of Hira in the last week of May 633. The inhabitants were given peace on the terms of annual payment of jizya and agreed to provide intelligence for Muslims. After resting his armies, in June 633, Khalid laid siege to Anbar which despite fierce resistance fell in July 633 as a result of the siege imposed on the town. Khalid then moved towards the south, and captured Ein ul Tamr in the last week of July, 633.

Later in December 633 some Arab tribes assisted by a Persian garrison did exactly what he had feared, in Ain al-Tamr. They attacked his supply line so Khalid ibn al-Walid fought them.

Khalid then moved to the siege of Ein-al-Tamr and made a pact with them too. With the fall of the main cities the whole of southern and central Iraq came under Muslim control. In 634 AD Abu Bakr ordered him to proceed to Syria with half of his army to command the invasion of the Byzantine Empire. Muthana bin Haris Al-Sheybani was left as the successor of Khalid. The Persians, under their new emperor Yazdgerd III, regrouped, concentrated new armies and defeated the Muslims in the Battle of the Bridge, and recaptured Iraq. The second invasion of Iraq was undertaken under Sa`d ibn Abī Waqqās who, after defeating the Sassanid army at the Battle of al-Qadisiyyah in 636 AD, captured Ctesiphon. This was followed by the whole scale invasion of the Sassanid Persian Empire.
