= Battle of al-Anbar =

633 battle during the Islamic conquest of Persia

Battle of Al-Anbar
- Part of Islamic conquest of Persia and Campaigns of Khalid ibn al-Walid
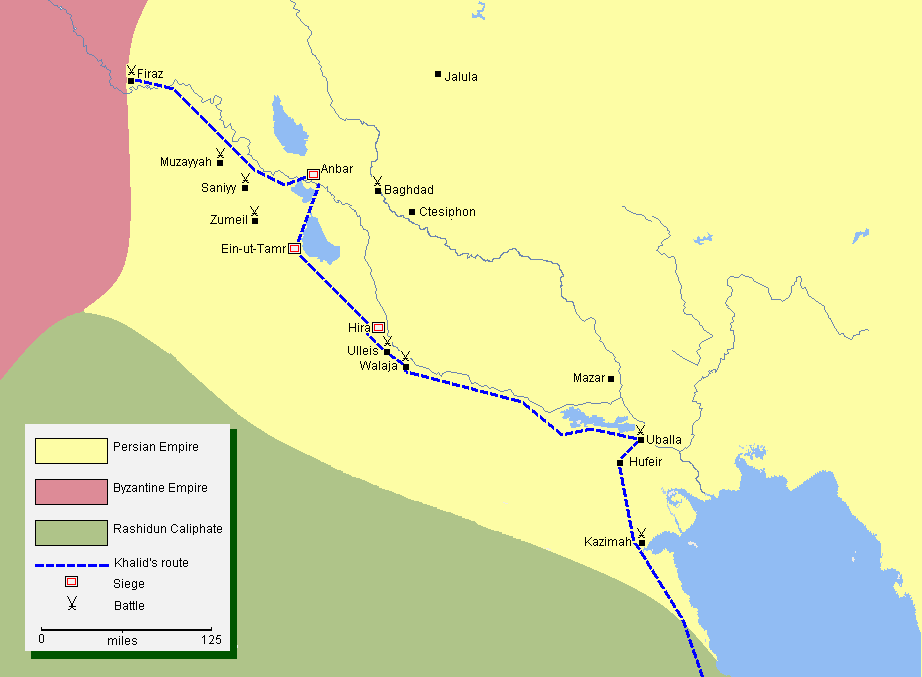
Date	633
Location	Sasanian Empire
Result	Rashidun victory

Belligerents
Rashidun Caliphate	Sasanian Empire

Commanders and leaders
Khalid ibn al-Walid	Shirzad

Strength
9,000	30,000

Casualties and losses
Few	7,000 soldiers died

The Battle of Al-Anbar (Arabic: معركة الأنبار) was between the Muslim Arab army under the command of Khalid ibn al-Walid and the Sasanian Empire. The battle took place at Anbar which is located approximately 80 miles from the ancient city of Babylon. Khalid besieged the Sassanian Persians in the city fortress, which had strong walls. Scores of Muslim archers were used in the siege. The Persian governor, Shirzad, eventually surrendered and was allowed to retire. The Battle of Al-Anbar is often remembered as the "Action of the Eye" since Muslim archers used in the battle were told to aim at the "eyes" of the Persian garrison.

During the battle, 1,000 Muslim arrows were shot at the Persians from the ramparts. After the 1,000 archers in the front row had finished, it was the turn of the 1,000 archers in the second line to fire their arrows. Over a thousand of Sheerzad's troops lost their sight from the Muslim arrows. Seeing the Muslims gaining the upper hand, Sheerzad sent an envoy offering peace on terms, but Khalid, who wanted an unconditional surrender, rejected the offer. The battle continued, with Khalid attempting to scale the ramparts by constructing a moat bridge and ladders. While the Muslims attempted to cross the moat, the ramparts' doors opened, and several Persian troops emerged, intending to counterattack. Their attempt failed, and they were repulsed and hastily closed the gates.

Sheerzad sent a second envoy to demand a peace agreement, seeing that there was no hope for the Muslim resistance. Khalid accepted, provided the Persians left Anbar, leaving only the native Arab population. Sheerzad surrendered and fled with his troops to Ctesiphon (Madain).

== Sources ==
- A.I. Akram, The Sword of Allah: Khalid bin al-Waleed, His Life and Campaigns, Nat. Publishing. House, Rawalpindi (1970) ISBN 978-0-7101-0104-4.
