= Battle of Hira =

633 battle

- Part of Islamic conquest of Persia and Campaigns of Khalid ibn al-Walid
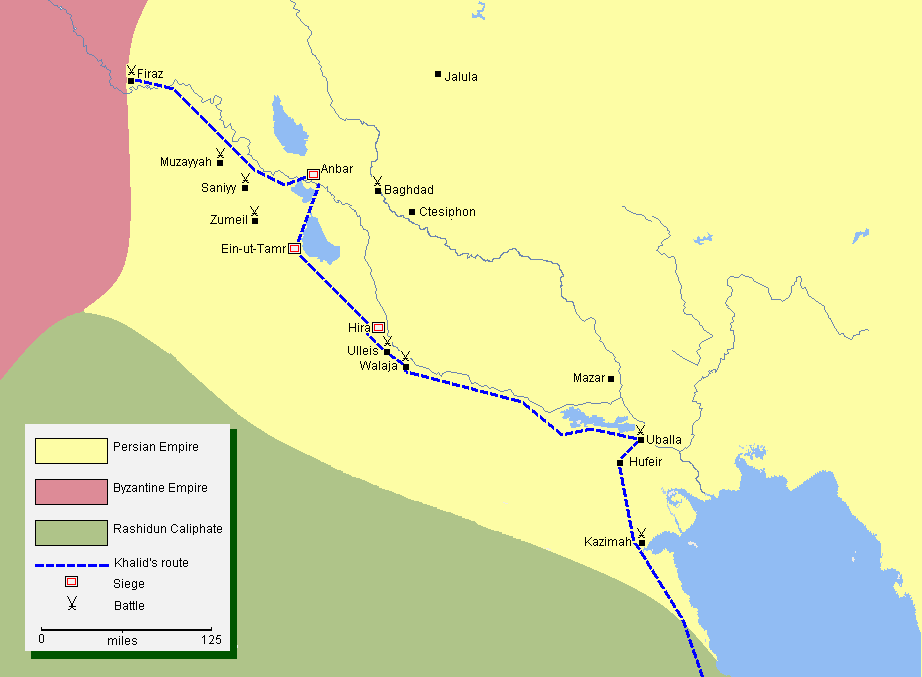
Date	May 633 A.D
Location	Al-Hirah, Iraq
Result	Rashidun Caliphate victory.

Belligerents
Rashidun Caliphate	Sasanian Empire

Commanders and leaders
Khalid ibn al-Walid	Iyas ibn Qabisah al-Ta'i, Abd al-Masih; Rustam †

Strength
~10,000–15,000	40,000(Muslim sources)

Casualties and losses
Few	Heavy

The Battle of Hira (Arabic: معركة الحيرة) was fought between the Sasanian Empire and the Rashidun Caliphate in 633. It was one of the early battles of the Muslim conquest of Persia. The loss of the frontier city on the Euphrates River opened the way to the Sasanian capital, Ctesiphon, on the Tigris River.

== Context ==
The city of Al-Hirah, widely known for its size and wealth, had been the capital of the Lakhmid Kingdom for centuries. It was annexed as a Sasanian frontier province in 602. During the expansion of the caliphate in 633, Caliph Abu Bakr sent Khalid ibn al-Walid to capture the lands south of the Euphrates (the as-Sawad).

After taking Ullais in May, the Muslim army under Khalid ibn al-Walid attacked the city of Hira in the last week of the month. They attacked the important canal before the city, which was garrisoned by Local Arab troops; attacking several crossings simultaneously, and forcing a Sasanian withdrawal. Persian general Rustam was killed in this action.

The remaining Sasanian defenders briefly sequestered themselves in the city's fortresses, but after brief fighting, the city quickly surrendered. The inhabitants paid a large tribute to spare the city and agreed to act as spies against the Sasanians, just as the inhabitants of Ullais had.

== Sources ==
- Morony, Michael G. (2005). Iraq After the Muslim Conquest. Piscataway, New Jersey: Gorgias Press. ISBN 978-15-93333-15-7.
