= Outline of Islam =

Abrahamic monotheistic religion

Islam is an Abrahamic monotheistic religion teaching that there is only one God (Allah) and that Muhammad is His last Messenger.

The following outline is provided as an overview of and topical guide to Islam.

== Beliefs ==
=== Aqidah ===
Allah
God in Islam
Tawhid, Oneness of God
Repentance in Islam
Islamic views on sin
Shirk, Partnership and Idolatory
Haram
Kufr
Bid‘ah

Sunni / Ibadi / Ahmadiyya

- Five Pillars of Islam
  - Shahada
  - Salah
  - Sawm
  - Zakat
  - Hajj
- Six articles of belief (Arkan al-Iman)
  - Tawhid
  - Prophets
  - Holy books
  - Angels
    - Jibril, Holy Spirit
  - Predestination
  - The Day of Judgment

Shia Twelvers

- Theological principles
  - Tawhid
  - Adl
  - Nubuwwah
  - Imamate
  - Mi'ad
- Ancillaries of the Faith
  - Salah
  - Sawm
  - Hajj
  - Zakat
  - Khums
  - Jihad
  - Amr-Bil-Ma'rūf
  - Nahi-Anil-Munkar
  - Tawalla
  - Tabarra

Shia Ismaili

- Seven pillars of Ismailism
  - Walayah
  - Taharah
  - Salah
  - Zakat
  - Sawm
  - Hajj
  - Jihad

=== Prophets ===
- Prophets of Islam
  - Muhammad in Islam
    - Muhammad's first revelation
    - Miracles of Muhammad
      - Isra and Miraj
      - Splitting of the Moon
    - Salawat
    - Mawlid
  - Nuh (Noah)
  - Ibrahim (Abraham)
  - Musa (Moses)
  - Isa (Jesus)
    - Second Coming of Isa
  - People of Ya-Sin
  - Stories of The Prophets

=== Scripture ===
- List of Islamic texts
  - Quran
    - Sura
      - List of surahs in the Quran
      - Meccan surah
      - Medinan surah
    - Ayat
    - Juz'
    - Muqatta'at
    - Quran and miracles
    - Challenge of the Quran
    - Women in the Quran
    - Female figures in the Quran
    - Biblical and Quranic narratives
    - Quranic parables
    - Tafsir
      - Naskh
    - Quran reading
      - Hafiz
      - Qira'at
      - Tajwid
      - Tarteel
    - Asbab al-nuzul
  - Tawrat (Torah)
  - Zabur (Psalms)
  - Injil (Gospel)
  - Sunnah
    - Hadith
      - Hadith studies
      - Hadith terminology
      - Hadith collections
        - Sunni – Kutub al-Sittah
          - Sahih Bukhari
          - Sahih Muslim
          - Sunan al-Sughra
          - Sunan Abu Dawood
          - Jami al-Tirmidhi
          - Sunan ibn Majah
        - Shia – Al-Kutub Al-Arb'ah
          - Kitab al-Kafi
          - Man la yahduruhu al-Faqih
          - Tahdhib al-Ahkam
          - Al-Istibsar
        - Ibadi
          - Jami Sahih
          - Tartib al-Musnad
    - Seerah

=== Denominational specifics ===
- Shia beliefs
  - Ahl al-Kisa
    - Muhammad in Islam
    - Ali
    - Fatimah
    - Hasan ibn Ali
    - Husayn ibn Ali
  - Imamah
  - Mourning of Muharram
  - Tawassul
  - The Four Companions
  - Shia clergy
  - Twelver beliefs
    - Imamate (Twelver doctrine)
    - The Fourteen Infallibles
    - Occultation (Islam)
    - Irfan
  - Ismaili beliefs
    - Imamah (Ismaili doctrine)
  - Nizari Ismaili beliefs
    - Imamate in Nizari doctrine
  - Alevi beliefs
    - Zahir
    - Batin
- Ahmadi beliefs
  - Bay'ah
  - Prophethood
  - Isa

== Practice ==
- Aqidah, Islamic term for denominational practice or theology
  - Salah
    - Prayer
      - Fard
        - Fajr prayer
        - Zuhr prayer
        - Asr prayer
        - Maghrib prayer
        - Isha prayer
      - Jumu'ah
      - Eid prayers
      - Tahajjud
      - Nafl prayer
    - Rakat
      - Basmala
      - Takbir
      - Ruku
      - Sujud
      - Tashahhud
      - Taslim
    - Mosque
      - Mihrab
      - Minbar
      - Khutbah
      - Musalla
      - Prayer rug
    - Conditions
      - Adhan
      - Iqama
      - Salat times
      - Qibla
      - Wudu
      - Ghusl
      - Turbah
  - Sawm
    - Ramadan
      - Suhur
      - Iftar
      - Tarawih
      - Iʿtikāf
      - Laylat al-Qadr
      - Eid al-Fitr
      - Zakat al-Fitr
  - Zakat
    - Sadaqah
  - Hajj
    - Ihram
    - Miqat
    - Tawaf
    - Stoning of the Devil
    - Eid al-Adha
    - Umrah
    - Holy Mosques
      - Masjid al-Haram
        - Kaaba
      - Al-Masjid an-Nabawi
      - Al-Masjid al-Aqsa
  - Jihad
  - Dawah

=== Denominational specifics ===
- Shia rituals
  - Mourning of Muharram
    - Day of Ashura
      - Imam Husayn Shrine
    - Arba'in pilgrimage
    - Ziyarat
      - Husayniyya
    - Marsiya
    - Noha
    - Maddahi
    - Soaz
    - Tasu'a
    - Tazia
    - Ta'ziyeh
    - Tatbir
    - Tabuik
    - Hosay
    - Chup Tazia
    - Rowzeh-khani
    - Hosseini infancy conference
  - Shia days of remembrance
    - Ashura
    - Arba'in
    - Mawlid
    - Eid al-Fitr
    - Eid al-Adha
    - Eid al-Ghadeer
- Ahmadiyya view
  - Jihad

== Schools and branches ==
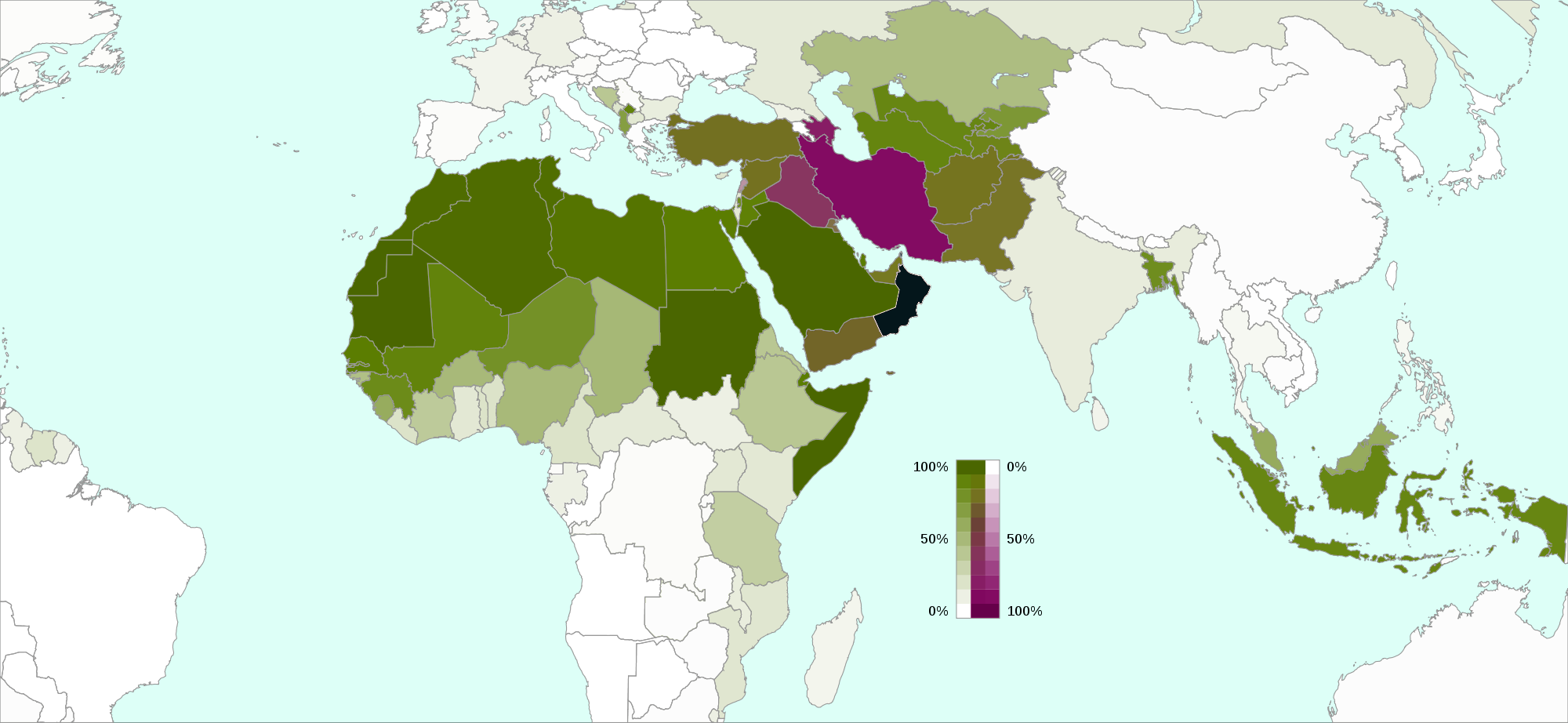
Islam by country Sunni Shia Ibadi

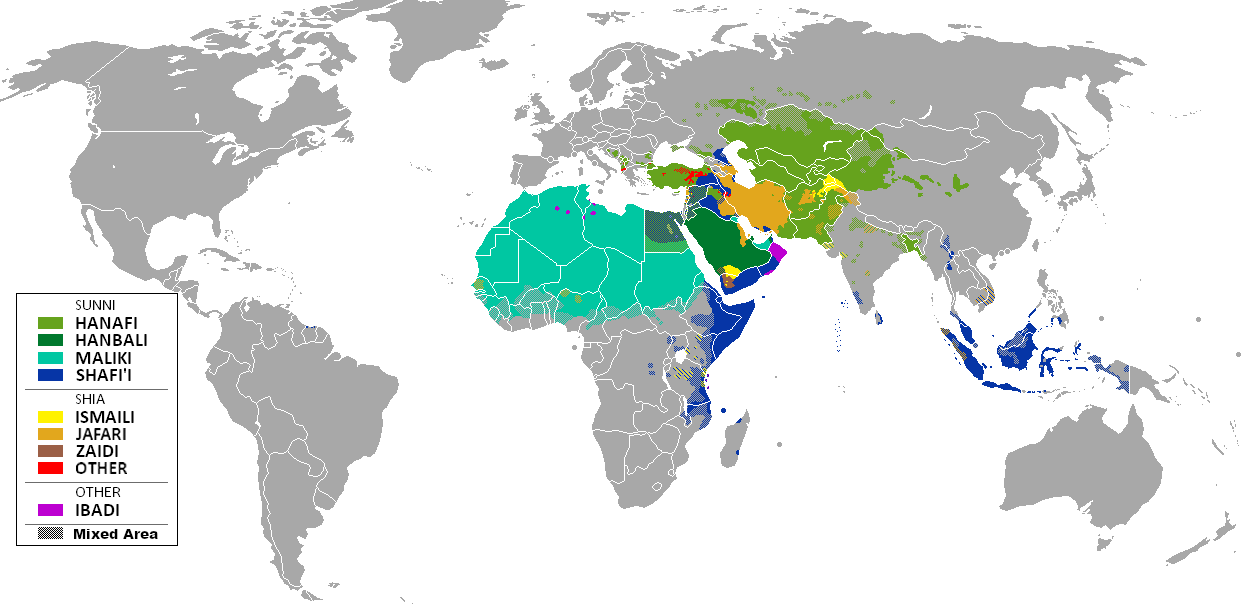
Distribution of Sunni, Shia, Quranist, Ibadi, and Nondenominational Muslim branches

- Schools of Islamic theology
- Madhhab
- Divisions of the world in Islam
- Islamic schools and branches a.k.a. The Islamic denomination or Muslim denominations
  - Denominational
    - Sunni Islam, a.k.a. Ahlus Sunnah wal Jamaah
      - Hanafi
      - Hanbali
      - Maliki
      - Shafi'i
        - Ashari
        - Maturidi
        - Athari
          - Salafi
          - Wahhabi
            - Madkhali
    - Shia Islam
      - Imami Shia
        - Imami Ismailism
          - Batiniyyah
          - Druze
          - Musta'li
          - Taiyabi
            - Alavi
            - Dawoodis
            - Progressive Dawoodis
            - Sulaymani
            - Assassins
            - Imami Twelvers
              - Alevism
                - Ghulat
                - Alawites
            - Qizilbash
            - Zaidiyyah ("Fiver")
    - Kharjites
    - Ibadi
  - Sufism – Tariqa – List of Sufi orders
    - Bektashi
    - Chishti
    - Galibi
    - Kubrawiya
    - Mevlevi
    - Mouride
    - Naqshbandi
    - Ni'matullahi
    - Noorbakshia
    - Oveysi
    - Qadiri
    - Qalandariyya
    - Rifa'i
    - Senussi
    - Shadhili
    - Suhrawardiyya
    - Tijaniyyah
  - Schools of Jurisprudence, Branches, Doctrines and Movements
    - Sunni
      - Hanafi
      - Maliki
      - Shafi'i
      - Hanbali
      - Zahiri
      - Ahl al-Hadith, (School of 2nd/3rd Islamic centuries)
      - Ahl-i Hadith, (Movement in South-Asia in mid-nineteenth English century)
      - Salafi movement
      - Wahhabism
    - Shia
      - Ja'fari
        - Usuli
        - Akhbari
      - Ismaili
      - Zaidi
  - Schools of Islamic theology
    - Kalam
      - Ash'ari
      - Maturidi
    - Athari
    - Murji'ah
      - Karramiyya
    - Mu'tazili
    - Qadariyyah
  - Other branches
    - Gülen movement
    - Islamism
    - Liberal Islam
    - Mahdavia
    - Nation of Islam
    - Non-denominational Muslims
    - Quranism
    - Suwarian tradition
- Conferences, Movements and Organizations on Union and Peace
  - Amman Message
  - 2016 international conference on Sunni Islam in Grozny
  - Organisation of Islamic Cooperation
  - The World Forum for Proximity of Islamic Schools of Thought
  - Islamic Unity week
  - Al-Azhar Shia Fatwa
  - International Islamic Unity Conference (Iran)
  - International Islamic Unity Conference (US)
  - Al-Azhar Shia Fatwa
  - The World Forum for Proximity of Islamic Schools of Thought
  - The Humanitarian Forum
  - Islamic Relief
  - British Muslim Forum
  - Muslim Charities Forum
  - Catholic–Muslim Forum
  - Muslim Safety Forum
  - A Common Word Between Us and You
  - Hindu–Muslim unity

== Philosophy ==
- Islamic philosophy
  - Early Islamic philosophy
    - Kalam
    - Avicennism
    - Averroism
    - Al-aql al-faal
  - Islamic ethics
    - Morality in Islam
  - Logic in Islamic philosophy
  - Islamic metaphysics
    - Kalam cosmological argument
    - Proof of the Truthful
  - Sufi philosophy
    - Sufi metaphysics
    - Sufi cosmology
    - Sufi psychology
    - Lataif-e-sitta
    - Concepts
      - Ruh
      - Hal
      - Manzil
      - Maqam
      - Fanaa
      - Baqaa
      - Yaqeen
      - Haqiqa
      - Marifa
      - Ihsan
  - Islamic attitudes towards science
    - Islamic views on evolution
      - Ahmadiyya views on evolution
  - Science in the medieval Islamic world
    - Alchemy and chemistry in the medieval Islamic world
    - Astrology in the medieval Islamic world
    - Astronomy in the medieval Islamic world
    - Cosmology in medieval Islam
    - Geography and cartography in the medieval Islamic world
    - Mathematics in the medieval Islamic world
    - Medicine in the medieval Islamic world
    - Prophetic medicine
    - Ophthalmology in the medieval Islamic world
    - Physics in the medieval Islamic world
    - Psychology in the medieval Islamic world
  - Islamic view of miracles
  - Contemporary Islamic philosophy

== Theology ==
- Islamic religious sciences
- Islamic theology
  - Theological concepts
    - Ahl al-Hadith (started in 2nd/3rd Islamic centuries)
    - Ahl-i Hadith (another movement in South-Asia in mid-nineteenth English century)
    - Ahl ar-Ra'y
    - Divisions of the world in Islam
    - Fi sabilillah
    - Ihsan
    - Iman
    - Itmam al-hujjah
    - Wasat
    - Shia theological concepts
      - Ismah
  - Categorization of individuals
    - Mumin
    - Muslim
    - Faqih
    - Fajir
    - Kafir
    - Munafiq
  - Groups
    - People of the Book
    - Ahl al-Fatrah
  - Theological titles
    - Caliph
    - Shaykh al-Islam
    - Sayyid
    - Sharif
    - Ulama
    - Faqih
    - Grand Imam of Al-Azhar
    - Mufti
      - Grand Mufti
    - Mujtahid
    - Ayatollah
    - Marja'
    - Imam
    - Mullah
    - Mujaddid
    - Qadi
    - Sheikh
    - Hajji
    - Ansar
- Islamic mythology
  - Beings
    - Angels
    - Iblis
    - Jinn
    - Ifrit
    - Shayṭān
    - Div
  - Exorcism in Islam, Ruqya
  - Places
    - Garden of Eden
    - Jannah
    - Jahannam
    - Seven Heavens
- Islamic eschatology
  - Mahdi
    - Signs of the reappearance of Muhammad al-Mahdi
    - Al-Masih ad-Dajjal
  - The Occultation
  - Barzakh
  - Shia eschatology

== Law ==
- Sharia
  - Sources of sharia
  - Application of sharia law by country
- Fiqh, The Islamic jurisprudence
  - Usul al-Fiqh, Principles of Islamic jurisprudence
    - Methodology and principles
      - Ijazah
      - Ijma
      - 'Aql
      - Ijtihad
      - Ikhtilaf
      - Istihlal
      - Istihsan
      - Madhhab
      - Madrasah
      - Maqasid
      - Maslaha
      - Qiyas
      - Taqlid
      - Urf
    - Ahkam
      - Batil
      - Bid'ah
      - Fard
      - Fasiq
      - Fitna
      - Gunah
      - Halal
      - Haram
      - Istishhad
      - Jihad
      - Makruh
      - Moharebeh
      - Mubah
      - Mustahabb
      - Taghut
      - Taqiya
      - Thawab
  - Topic of fiqh
    - Ibadah
    - Political
      - Islamic leadership
      - Bay'ah
      - Dhimmi
    - Marital
      - Marriage in Islam
        - Islamic marriage contract
        - Mahr
        - Nikah Misyar
        - Nikah Halala
        - Nikah 'urfi
        - Nikah mut'ah
      - Polygyny in Islam
      - Divorce in Islam
      - Islamic adoptional jurisprudence
    - Sexual
      - Islam and masturbation
      - Islamic sexual hygienical jurisprudence
      - Rape in Islamic law
      - Zina
      - Intimate parts in Islam
    - Criminal
      - Hudud
        - Islam and blasphemy
        - Maisir
        - Zina
        - Hirabah
        - Fasad
        - Rajm
        - Tazir
        - Qisas
        - Diya
      - Apostasy in Islam
      - Beheading in Islam
    - Etiquette
      - Adab
      - Gender segregation
        - Harem
      - Mahram
      - Islamic honorifics
      - Islam on female genital mutilation
    - Economics
      - Zakat
        - Jizya
        - Nisab
        - Khums
        - Sadaqah
        - Waqf
        - Bayt al-mal
      - Islamic banking and finance
        - Ribat
        - Murabaha
        - Takaful
        - Sukuk
      - Islamic inheritance jurisprudence
    - Hygiene
      - Islamic toilet etiquette
      - Taharah
      - Wudu
      - Masah
      - Ghusl
      - Tayammum
      - Miswak
      - Najis
    - Dietary
      - Dhabihah
      - Khamr
      - Prohibition of pork
    - Military
      - Jihad
      - Hudna
      - Istijarah
      - Prisoners of war in Islam
      - Slavery
        - Ma malakat aymanukum
- Hisbah
  - Islamic religious police

== Hadith ==
Main article
Hadith
Important Sunni Hadith
Kutub al-Sittah
Sahih al-Bukhari
Sahih Muslim
Al-Sunan al-Sughra
Sunan Abu Dawood
Jami` at-Tirmidhi
Sunan ibn Majah
Important Shia Hadith
The Four Books
Kitab al-Kafi
Man la yahduruhu al-Faqih
Tahdhib al-Ahkam
Al-Istibsar

Hadith Collectors
Muhammad al-Bukhari
Muslim ibn al-Hajjaj
Abu Dawood
Commentary for Sahih al-Bukhari
Fath al-Bari

Related
Hadith studies
Hadith terminology

== The supernatural in Islam ==
Islamic Concept of God
God in Islam
Names of God in Islam
Allah

The Light before the Material World
Nūr (Islam)
Muhammad in Islam
Al-Insān al-Kāmil
Holy Spirit in Islam

Miracles
Islamic view of miracles
Quran and miracles

Challenge of the Quran

Miracles of Muhammad
Saints

The Angels
Angels in Islam
Alam al Jabarut
Archangel
Artiya'il
Azrael
Cherub
Darda'il
Gabriel
Habib
Harut and Marut
Illiyin
Israfil, Raphael (archangel)
Jannah
Kiraman Katibin
Michael (archangel)
Mu'aqqibat, Hafaza, The Guardian angels
Recording angel
Riḍwan
Seraph

Beings and Forces in ordinary life
Asmodeus
Barakah

Al-Baqarah
Al-Ikhlas
Al-Mu'awwidhatayn

Al-Falaq
Al-Nas

Adhan
Throne Verse, also known as Al-Baqara 255 and Ayatul Kursi

Evil eye
Hatif
Hinn (mythology)
Ifrit
Jinn
Sura Al-Jinn
Exorcism in Islam

Ful-filling Fard
Preventing Major Sins

Removing Haram objects from body and Home
Destroying suspicious magical items, Ta'wiz, Talisman, Amulet

Stop giving information to suspects, Fortune-tellers, Magicians

Marid
Magic (paranormal)
Malakut
Peri
Qalb
Qareen
Solomon in Islam

Death and Human spirit
Barzakh
Illiyin
Islamic view of death
Munkar and Nakir
Nāzi'āt and Nāshiṭāt
Nafs
Rūḥ

Fallen Angels, Devils and Hell
As-Sirāt
Azazil
Dajjal
Div
Falak (Arabian legend)
Fallen angel
Iblis
Jahannam
Maalik
Nar as Samum
Shaitan
Sijjin
Zabaniyya
Zaqqum

== Islamic Legends ==
Adam in Islam
Akhirah
Al-Safa and Al-Marwah
Azazel
Azrael
Barzakh
Beast of the Earth
Biblical and Quranic narratives
Biblical figures in Islamic tradition
Black Standard
Black Stone
Cain and Abel in Islam
Crescent
Darda'il
Devil (Islam)
Dhul-Qarnayn
Dome of the Rock
Foundation Stone
Gabriel
Gog and Magog
Green in Islam
Hafaza
Hajj
Harut and Marut
Hateem
Holy Spirit (Islam)
Ishmael in Islam
Islamic eschatology
Islamic flags
Islamic view of angels
Islamic view of Jesus' death
Isra and Mi'raj
Israfil
Jahannam
Jannah
Jesus in Ahmadiyya Islam
Jesus in Islam
Kaaba
Khidr
Kiraman Katibin
Kiswah
Maalik
Mahdi
Mary in Islam
Masih ad-Dajjal
Michael (archangel)
Moses in Islam
Mu'aqqibat
Munkar and Nakir
Noah in Islam
Queen of Sheba
Raphael (archangel)
Recording angel
Ridwan (name)
Rub el Hizb
Sarah
Satan
Solomon in Islam
Star and crescent
Symbols of Islam
Tawaf
The Occultation
Well of Souls
Zamzam Well
Zaqqum

== History ==
- History of Islam
  - Timeline of Muslim history
- Timeline of Muslim history Year by Year

Timeline of 6th-century Muslim history
Timeline of 7th-century Muslim history
Timeline of 8th-century Muslim history
Timeline of 9th-century Muslim history
Timeline of 10th-century Muslim history
Timeline of 11th-century Muslim history
Timeline of 12th-century Muslim history
Timeline of 13th-century Muslim history
Timeline of 14th-century Muslim history
Timeline of 15th-century Muslim history
Timeline of 16th-century Muslim history
Timeline of 17th-century Muslim history
Timeline of 18th-century Muslim history
Timeline of 19th-century Muslim history
Timeline of 20th-century Muslim history
Timeline of 21st-century Muslim history

  - Historiography of early Islam
  - List of dynasties of Muslim Rulers
    - List of Sunni Muslim dynasties
    - List of Shia Muslim dynasties
- Early history
  - Muhammad in Mecca
  - Persecution of Muslims by Meccans
  - Hijrah
    - Migration to Abyssinia
  - List of expeditions of Muhammad
    - Battle of Badr
    - Battle of Uhud
    - Battle of the Trench
    - Battle of Hunayn
  - Muhammad in Medina
    - Constitution of Medina
  - Farewell Pilgrimage
  - The event of Ghadir Khumm
  - Succession to Muhammad
  - Saqifa
  - Umar at Fatimah's house
  - Caliphate
  - Salaf
    - Sahaba
    - Tabi'un
    - Tabi' al-Tabi'in
  - Rashidun Caliphate
    - Abu Bakr
      - Ridda wars
    - Umar
      - Military conquests of Umar's era
      - Reforms of Umar's era (Pact of Umar)
    - Uthman
      - The election of Uthman
      - Siege of Uthman
      - Military campaigns under Caliph Uthman
    - Muslim conquests
      - Early Muslim conquests
        - Muslim conquest of Persia
    - First Fitna
      - Battle of Karbala
- Classical era
  - Umayyad Caliphate
    - Dinar (Gold dinar) / Dirham / Fals
    - Shurta
    - Second Fitna
    - Umayyad conquest of Hispania
      - Timeline of the Muslim presence in the Iberian peninsula
        - Caliphate of Cordoba
  - Abbasid Caliphate
    - Islamic Golden Age
    - Muslim Agricultural Revolution
    - Mihna
    - Shu'ubiyya
      - Islamization of Iran
    - Muslim conquest of the Indian subcontinent
    - Mali Empire
    - Bayt al-Hikma
    - Zanj Rebellion
    - Baghdad Manifesto
    - Siege of Baghdad (1258)
  - Crusades
  - Ghaznavids
  - Seljuk Empire
  - Ghurid dynasty
  - Khwarazmian dynasty
  - Fatimid Caliphate
  - Ayyubid dynasty
  - Ilkhanate
  - Mamluk Sultanate
    - Sultan
  - Almoravid dynasty
  - Almohad Caliphate
  - Taifa
- Pre-Modern era
  - Ottoman Empire
    - Islam in the Ottoman Empire
    - Millet
    - Devshirme
    - Ottoman persecution of Alevis
    - Slavery in the Ottoman Empire
  - Timurid Empire
  - Safavids
  - Mughal Empire
    - Mansabdar
  - Al Andalus
    - Reconquista
  - The spread of Islam in Indonesia (1200 to 1600)
    - Wali Sanga
- Modern times
  - Partitioning of the Ottoman Empire
    - Tanzimat
    - Sykes-Picot Agreement
  - Saudi Arabia
    - Wahhabism
    - Destruction of early Islamic heritage sites in Saudi Arabia
    - Grand Mosque seizure
  - Sokoto Caliphate
  - Ahmadiyya Caliphate
  - Pakistan movement
  - Arab–Israeli conflict / Israeli–Palestinian conflict
  - War in Afghanistan (1978–present)
  - Iranian Revolution
  - Gulf War / Iraq War
  - September 11 attacks
  - Arab Spring / Arab Winter
    - Syrian Civil War
    - Iraqi Civil War (2014–2017)
    - Libyan Civil War
    - Yemeni Civil War (2015–present)

=== History of Islam by topic ===
- History of Hajj
  - Incidents during the Hajj
- History of the Quran
  - Wahy
  - Early Quranic manuscripts
  - Quranic timeline
- History of Ahmadiyya
- History of Alevism
- History of Nizari Ismailism
- History of Shia Islam
- History of Islam in the medieval Algeria
- History of Islam in China
- History of Islam in the medieval Egypt
- History of Islam in southern Italy
- History of Islam in Yemen
- Reception of Islam in Early Modern Europe

== Society ==
Today's date []
System	Date
Gregorian calendar	31 October, AD 2026
Islamic calendar	19 Jumada al-awwal, AH 1448 (using tabular method)

- Ummah
- Islamic calendar
- Islam and humanity
- Islam and children
- Gender roles in Islam
- Women in Islam
- LGBT in Islam
- Mukhannathun
- Islam and clothing
- Animals in Islam
- Muslim holidays
- Qurbani
- Nursing in Islam
- Symbols of Islam
- Islamic education
  - Hawza
  - Islamic studies
  - Madrasa
    - List of Islamic seminaries
    - List of Muslim educational institutions
    - List of oldest madrasahs in continuous operation

=== Places ===
- Holiest sites in Islam
  - Mecca
    - Masjid al-Haram
  - Medina
    - Al-Masjid an-Nabawi
  - Al Quds
    - Al-Aqsa
  - Holiest sites in Sunni Islam
  - Holiest sites in Shia Islam
    - Najaf
      - Imam Ali Mosque
    - Karbala
      - Imam Husayn Shrine
      - Al Abbas Mosque
    - Mecca
      - Al-Baqi'
      - Jannat al-Mu'alla
    - Damascus
      - Sayyidah Zaynab Mosque
      - Sayyidah Ruqayya Mosque
      - Bab al-Saghir
    - Holy sites specific to Twelver Shia Muslims
      - Mashhad
        - Imam Reza shrine
      - Kadhimiya
        - Al-Kadhimiya Mosque
      - Samarra
        - Al-Askari Mosque
      - Qom
        - Fatima Masumeh Shrine

=== Culture ===
- Islamic culture
- Islamic art
  - Arabesque
  - Girih
  - Islamic geometric patterns
  - Islamic interlace patterns
  - Sitara (textile)
  - Zellige
- Islamic architecture
  - Architectural elements
    - Ablaq
    - Iwan
    - Mashrabiya
    - Minaret
    - Muqarnas
    - Sahn
  - Architectural types
    - Kasbah
    - Khanqah
    - Mosque
      - List of largest mosques
      - List of the oldest mosques
    - Madrasa
    - Ribat
    - Zawiya
- Islamic calligraphy
  - Diwani
  - Kufic
  - Naskh
  - Nastaʿlīq
- Islamic garden
- Islamic glass
- Islamic literature
  - Islamic advice literature
  - Islamic poetry
  - Sufi poetry
  - Miniatures
    - Ottoman miniature
    - Mughal miniature
    - Persian miniature
- Islamic music
  - Nasheed
- Oriental rug
- Islamic pottery
- Islamic veiling practices by country
- Islam and sport
  - Islam in association football
  - Muslim women in sport
    - Women and bicycling in Islam

=== Politics ===
- Political aspects of Islam
- Shia–Sunni relations
- Islam and modernity
  - Islamic Modernism
    - Islam and secularism
    - Islam Hadhari
    - Islam Nusantara
    - Islamic democracy
      - Cairo Declaration on Human Rights in Islam
      - Arab Charter on Human Rights
      - Shura
      - Turkish model
    - Liberalism and progressivism within Islam
      - Cultural Muslim
      - Enlightened moderation
      - Islamic feminism
      - Quranism
  - Islamic revivalism
    - Al-Ahbash
    - Barelvi movement
    - Deobandi movement
    - Gülen movement
    - Islamism
      - Islamic fundamentalism
      - Islamization
        - Islamization of knowledge
      - Qutbism
        - Jihadism
      - Salafi movement
        - Madkhalism
        - Sahwa movement
        - Salafi jihadism
          - Mujahideen
          - Shahid
        - Wahhabism
      - Post-Islamism
    - Pan-Islamism
  - Islamic state
    - Islamic republic
    - Islamic socialism
- Persecution of Muslims
  - Persecution of minority Muslim groups
  - Islamophobia
    - Islamophobic incidents

=== Muslim world ===
The Muslim population of the world map by percentage of each country, according to the Pew Forum (assessed on 29 June 2014).

- Muslim world
  - Islam by country
  - List of Muslim-majority countries
  - List of countries by Muslim population
- Islamic organizations
  - International organization
    - Organisation of Islamic Cooperation
      - International Association of Islamic Banks
      - Islamic Educational, Scientific and Cultural Organization
      - Statistical, Economic and Social Research and Training Centre for Islamic Countries
    - Islamic Military Alliance
  - Islamic political parties
    - Islamic democratic
      - National Islamic Movement of Afghanistan (Afghanistan)
      - Islamic Renaissance Movement (Algeria)
      - Al-Menbar Islamic Society (Bahrain)
      - Bangladesh Islami Front (Bangladesh)
      - Islami Oikya Jote (Bangladesh)
      - Party of Democratic Action (Bosnia and Herzegovina)
      - Al-Wasat Party (Egypt)
      - National Awakening Party (Indonesia)
      - National Mandate Party (Indonesia)
      - United Development Party (Indonesia)
      - All India Majlis-e-Ittehadul Muslimeen (India)
      - Indian Union Muslim League (India)
      - Islamic Action Organisation (Iraq)
      - Islamic Dawa Party (Iraq)
      - Islamic Fayli Grouping in Iraq (Iraq)
      - Kurdistan Islamic Group (Iraq)
      - Islamic Labour Movement in Iraq (Iraq)
      - Islamic Union of Iraqi Turkoman (Iraq)
      - Islamic Centrist Party (Jordan)
      - National Patriotic Party (Kazakhstan)
      - United Malays National Organisation (Malaysia)
      - Jamaat-e-Islami Pakistan (Pakistan)
      - Pakistan Tehreek-e-Insaf (Pakistan)
      - Lakas–CMD (Philippines)
      - Moro Islamic Liberation Front (Philippines)
      - United Bangsamoro Justice Party (Philippines)
      - Ideal Democratic Party (Rwanda)
      - Sri Lanka Muslim Congress (Sri Lanka)
      - Ennahda Movement (Tunisia)
    - Islamic liberal
      - Islamic Iran Participation Front (Iran)
      - National Forces Alliance (Libya)
    - Sunni Islamist
      - Islamic Dawah Organisation of Afghanistan (Afghanistan)
      - Hezbi Islami (Afghanistan)
      - Jamiat-e Islami (Afghanistan)
      - Green Algeria Alliance (Algeria)
      - Movement of Society for Peace (Algeria)
      - Movement for National Reform (Algeria)
      - Bangladesh Jamaat-e-Islami (Bangladesh)
      - Islamic Front Bangladesh (Bangladesh)
      - Committee for National Revolution (East Turkestan)
      - Freedom and Justice Party (Egypt)
      - Building and Development Party (Egypt)
      - Islamic Party (Egypt)
      - Prosperous Justice Party (Indonesia)
      - Crescent Star Party (Indonesia)
      - Reform Star Party (Indonesia)
      - Iraqi Islamic Party (Iraq)
      - Kurdistan Islamic Union (Iraq)
      - Zamzam (party) (Jordan)
      - Islamic Action Front (Jordan)
      - Hadas (Kuwait)
      - Al-Jama'a al-Islamiyya (Lebanon)
      - Justice and Construction Party (Libya)
      - Homeland Party (Libya)
      - Malaysian Islamic Party (PAS) (Malaysia)
      - Islamic Democratic Party (Maldives)
      - Justice and Development Party (Morocco)
      - Jamiat Ahle Hadith (Pakistan)
      - Jamiat Ulema-e Islam (F) (Pakistan)
      - Hamas (Palestine)
      - National Congress (Sudan)
      - Muslim Brotherhood of Syria (Syria)
      - Islamic Renaissance Party of Tajikistan (Tajikistan)
      - Felicity Party (Turkey)
    - Shia Islamist
      - Islamic Movement of Afghanistan (Afghanistan)
      - Hizb-i-Wahdat (Afghanistan)
      - Islamic Party of Azerbaijan (Azerbaijan)
      - Al Wefaq (Bahrain)
      - Bahrain Freedom Movement (Bahrain)
      - Islamic Action Society (Bahrain)
      - Hezbollah (Lebanon)
      - Alliance of Builders of Islamic Iran (Iran)
      - Islamic Coalition Party (Iran)
      - National Iraqi Alliance (Iraq)
      - Islamic Dawa Party – Iraq Organisation (Iraq)
      - Islamic Supreme Council of Iraq (Iraq)
      - Islamic Virtue Party (Iraq)
      - Tehrik-e-Jafaria (Pakistan)
    - Salafist
      - Al Asalah (Bahrain)
      - Young Kashgar Party (East Turkestan)
      - Al-Nour Party (Egypt)
      - Adhaalath Party (Maldives)
      - Muttahida Majlis-e-Amal (Pakistan)
      - Al-Islah (Yemen)
  - Militant organization
    - Sunni Jihadism
      - Abu Sayyaf
      - al-Itihaad al-Islamiya
      - Al-Qaeda
      - Al-Shabaab
      - Ansar al-Islam
      - Ansar al-Sharia
      - Boko Haram
      - Darul Islam
      - Gerakan Mujahidin Islam Patani
      - Hizbul Islam
      - Indonesian Mujahedeen Council
      - Islamic State of Iraq and the Levant
      - Laskar Jihad
      - Taliban
    - Shia Jihadism
      - Hezbollah
  - Non-governmental organization
    - Muslim Brotherhood (Egypt)
    - Muhammadiyah (Indonesia)
    - Nahdlatul Ulama (Indonesia)
    - Indonesian Ulema Council (Indonesia)
    - PERSIS (organization) (Indonesia)
    - Islamic Defenders Front (Indonesia)
    - Tamil Nadu Muslim Munnetra Kazagham (India)
    - Popular Front of India (India)
    - Dawat-e-Islami (Pakistan)
    - Society of the Revival of Islamic Heritage
    - Muslim World League
    - Islamic relief organizations
      - International Islamic Relief Organization
      - Islamic Relief
        - Islamic Relief USA
      - Muslim Aid
      - IHH Humanitarian Relief Foundation
      - Imam Khomeini Relief Foundation
      - International Islamic Council for Da'wah and Relief
      - Solidarity Youth Movement
      - The Zakat Foundation

== People ==
=== Key religious figures ===
- Prophets and messengers in Islam

Prophets and messengers in the Qur'an
Name	Prophet	Messenger	Ulul'Azm	Book	Sent to	Law (Sharia)	Judeo-Christian Equivalent	Chronological Order
Harun	✓						Aaron	15
Ibrahim	✓	✓	✓	Scrolls of Abraham	The people of Ibrahim	✓	Abraham	6
Adam/Aadam	✓						Adam	1
Da'ud	✓			Zabur (Psalms)			David	17
Ilias	✓	✓			The people of Elias		Elijah	19
Alyasa	✓						Elisha	20
Idris	✓						Enoch	2
Dhul-Kifl	✓						Ezekiel	16
Hud	✓	✓			ʿĀd		Eber	4
Is'haq	✓						Isaac	9
Isma'il	✓	✓					Ishmael	8
Yaqub	✓						Jacob	10
Shuaib	✓	✓			Midian		Jethro	13
Isa	✓	✓	✓	Injil (Gospel)	The people of Israel	✓	Jesus	24
Ayyub	✓						Job	12
Yahya	✓						John the Baptist	23
Yusuf	✓	✓					Joseph	11
Younis	✓	✓			The people of Younis		Jonah	21
Lut	✓	✓			The people of Lot		Lot	7
Nuh	✓	✓	✓		The people of Noah	✓	Noah	3
Muhammad	✓	✓	✓	Quran	Whole Mankind and Jinn	✓		25
Musa	✓	✓	✓	Tawrah (Torah)	Pharaoh and his establishment	✓	Moses	14
Salih	✓	✓			Thamud		Salah	5
Sulaiman	✓						Solomon	18
Zakariyyah	✓						Zechariah	22

==== Muhammad ====
- Muhammad's wives

==== Sahabah ====
- Sahabah
- List of Sahabah
  - List of non-Arab Sahabah

Ashara e mubashra
Hadith of the ten promised paradise
Abu Bakr
Umar
Uthman ibn Affan
Ali
Talhah
Az-Zubair
Abdur Rahman bin Awf
Sa'd bin Abi Waqqas
Abu Ubaidah ibn al-Jarrah
Sa'id ibn Zayd
Most hadith narrating sahabah
Abu Hurairah
Abdullah Ibn Umar
Anas ibn Malik
Aisha
Abd Allah ibn Abbas
Jabir ibn Abd Allah
Abu Sa‘id al-Khudri
Abdullah ibn Masud
'Abd Allah ibn 'Amr ibn al-'As

===== Umar =====
- Family tree of Umar
- Umm Kulthum bint Ali (Wife)
- Abdullah ibn Umar (son)
- Hafsa bint Umar (Daughter)
- Asim ibn Umar (son)
- Sunni view of Umar
- Shi'a view of Umar
- Ten Promised Paradise

===== Uthman =====
- Family tree of Uthman
- Uthman Quran

=== Denominational specifics ===
==== Sunni Islam ====
- List of Sunni Islamic scholars by schools of jurisprudence

===== Deobandi =====
- List of Deobandis
- List of students of Mahmud Hasan Deobandi
- List of Darul Uloom Deoband alumni
- Ashraf Ali Thanwi
- Hussain Ahmad Madani

===== Barelvi =====
- Ahmed Raza Khan Barelvi

==== Shia Islam ====
- The Four Companions
  - Abū Dhar al-Ghifāri
  - Ammār ibn Yāsir
  - Miqdad ibn Aswād al-Kindi
  - Salman the Persian
- Holy women of Shia Islam
  - Fatimah
  - Khadija bint Khuwaylid
  - Umm Salama
  - Zaynab bint Ali
  - Umm Kulthum bint Ali
  - Umm ul-Banin
  - Fatimah bint Hasan
  - Sukayna bint Husayn
  - Rubab
  - Shahrbanu
  - Fātimah bint Mūsā
  - Hakimah Khātūn
  - Narjis
  - Fatimah bint Asad
  - Umm Farwah bint al-Qasim
- Companions of Ali ibn Abi Talib
- Companions of Ali ibn Husayn Zayn al-Abidin
- List of Shia Imams
- List of current maraji
  - List of deceased maraji

===== Imami Twelver =====
- The Fourteen Infallibles
  - Muhammad in Islam
  - Fātimah
  - Ali
  - Hasan ibn Ali
  - Husayn ibn Ali
  - Ali ibn Husayn Zayn al-Abidin
  - Muhammad al-Baqir
  - Ja'far al-Sadiq
  - Mūsā al-Kādhim
  - Alī ar-Ridhā
  - Muhammad al-Jawad
  - Ali al-Hadi
  - Hasan al-'Askarī
  - Muhammad al-Mahdi

===== Imami Ismailism =====
- List of Ismaili imams

===== Alevism =====
Key figures

- Khadija bint Khuwaylid
- Fatimah
- Khidr
- Salman the Persian
- Uwais al-Qarani
- Jābir ibn Hayyān
- Dhul-Nun al-Misri
- Bayazid Bastami
- Ibn al-Rawandi
- Mansur Al-Hallaj
- Nasir Khusraw
- Abu al-Hassan al-Kharaqani
- Yusuf Hamdani
- Khoja Akhmet Yassawi
- Abdul-Qadir Gilani
- Ahmed ar-Rifa'i
- Ibn Arabi
- Qutb ad-Dīn Haydar
- Ahi Evren
- Haji Bektash Veli
- Rumi
- Sadr al-Din al-Qunawi
- Zahed Gilani
- Sari Saltik
- Yunus Emre
- Safi-ad-din Ardabili
- Nāimī
- Sadr al-Dīn Mūsā
- Imadaddin Nasimi
- Shah Nimatullah Wali
- Shaykh Junayd
- Shaykh Haydar
- Ali Mirza Safavi
- Ismail I
- Nur-Ali Khalifa
- Kaygusuz Abdal
- Otman Baba
- Balım Sultan
- Gül Baba
- Fuzûlî
- Alians
- Demir Baba Teke
- Arabati Baba Teḱe
- Pir Sultan Abdal
- Kul Nesîmî
- Sheikh Bedreddin
- Börklüce Mustafa
- Torlak Kemal

==== Islamism ====
Key ideologues

- Abul Hasan Ali Nadwi
- Mahmud Hasan Deobandi
- Ashraf Ali Thanwi
- Hussain Ahmad Madani
- Shah Ahmad Shafi
- Sayyid Qutb
- Abul A'la Maududi
- Yusuf al-Qaradawi
- Taqi al-Din al-Nabhani
- Muhammad Asad
- Hassan al-Banna
- Ata Abu Rashta
- Haji Shariatullah
- Jamāl al-Dīn al-Afghānī
- Muhammad Abduh
- Rashid Rida
- Muhammad Iqbal
- Muhammad Nasiruddin al-Albani
- Hassan Al-Turabi
- Mahathir Mohamad
- Ahmed Yassin
- Ali Shariati
- Navvab Safavi
- Ali Khamenei
- Ruhollah Khomeini
- Qazi Hussain Ahmad
- Rached Ghannouchi
- Necmettin Erbakan
- Safwat Hegazi

==== Modernist Salafism ====
  - Muhammad Abduh
  - Rashid Rida

==== Salafi movement ====
- List of Salafi scholars
  - Abd al-Aziz ibn Baz
  - Muhammad ibn al Uthaymeen
  - Muhammad Nasiruddin al-Albani
  - Muqbil bin Hadi al-Wadi'i
  - Sayyid Qutb
  - Umar Sulaiman Al-Ashqar

==== Sufism ====
- List of contemporary Sufi scholars
- List of modern Sufi scholars
- List of Sufi saints

=== List of Muslims by topic ===
==== Historical ====
- List of Caliphs
- List of honored women in Islam
- List of Ayyubid sultans and emirs
- List of Mamluk sultans
- List of Ghaznavid sultans
- Grand Viziers of the Safavid Empire
- Viziers of the Samanid Empire
- List of Sheikh-ul-Islams of the Ottoman Empire
- Grand Viziers of Ottoman Empire

==== Denominational / religious-related occupational ====
- List of Ahmadis
- List of Alawites
- List of converts to Islam
- List of Da'is
- List of Hanafis
- List of Ash'aris and Maturidis
- List of Islamic jurists
- List of Mahdi claimants
- List of Muslim theologians
- List of Shi'a Muslims
  - List of Shia Muslim scholars of Islam
- List of Sufis
  - List of Sufi singers

==== Professional ====
- List of Islamic studies scholars
- List of modern-day Muslim scholars of Islam
- List of Muslim comparative religionists
- List of Muslim feminists
- List of Muslim historians
- List of Muslim painters
- List of Muslim philosophers
- List of Muslim Rajputs
- List of Muslim scientists
  - List of Muslim astronauts
  - List of Muslim astronomers
  - List of Muslim geographers
  - List of Muslim mathematicians
- List of Muslim soldiers
- List of Muslim writers and poets
- List of Muslims in entertainment and the media

==== Regional ====
- Islamic rulers in the Indian subcontinent
- List of American Muslims
- List of British Muslims
- List of Burmese Muslims
- List of Chinese Muslims
- List of Canadian Muslims
- List of German Muslims
- List of Indian Muslims
  - List of notable Hyderabadi Muslims
- List of Israeli Arab Muslims

== See also ==
- Glossary of Islam
- Index of Islam-related articles
- Outline of religion#Islam topics
