= Islam Nusantara =

Indonesian brand of Islam

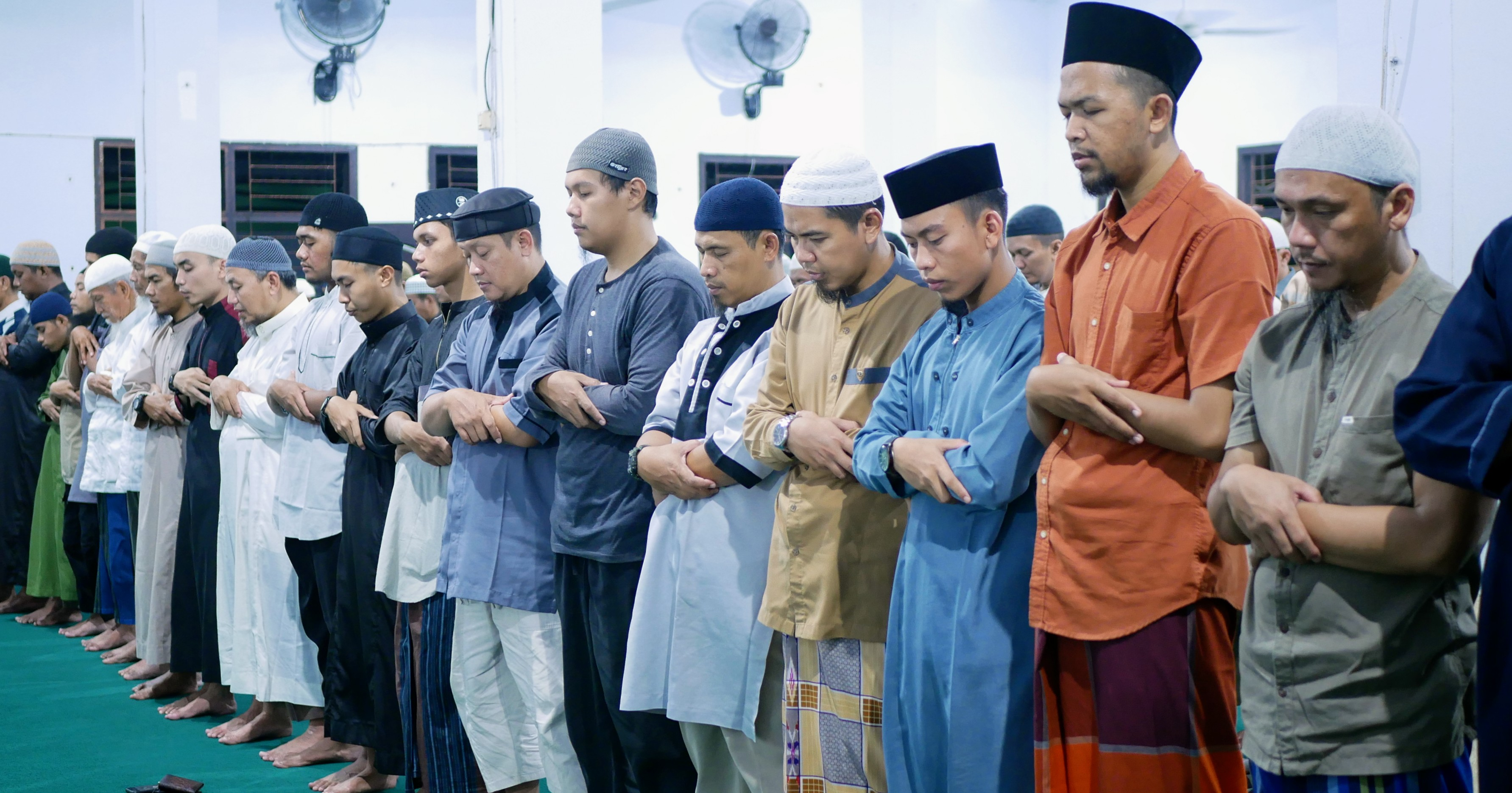
Indonesian Muslim men, some wearing kupiah, songkok, and sarong standing in salah.

Islam Nusantara, also known as the Indonesian Islamic model or Traditionalist Islam, is a term used to refer to the empirical and syncretic form of Islam developed in the Nusantara (Indonesian archipelago). The Indonesian Islamic organization Nahdlatul Ulama (NU) introduced and promoted the term in 2015 as a rejection of Wahhabism. Generally, it blends Islam with the region's ancient native beliefs, which were primarily Hindu–Buddhist for centuries.

According to NU, the roots of Islam in the archipelago can be traced back to at least the 16th century, as a result of interaction, contextualization, indigenization, interpretation and vernacularization of universal Islamic values, according to socio-cultural reality of Indonesia. Islam Nusantara is defined as an interpretation of Islam that takes into account local Indonesian customs in forming its fiqh. It tends to express greater pluralism and moderation, opposition to fundamentalism, and a degree of syncretism with local traditions.

An estimated 20 to 40% of all Indonesian Muslims adhere to or culturally align with Islam Nusantara in varying degrees. Geographically, these traditionalist Muslims are most heavily concentrated on the island of Java, particularly within the rural strongholds of Central and East Java, where the traditional pesantren (Islamic boarding school) system remains deeply rooted. In June 2015, Indonesian President Joko Widodo openly expressed his support for Islam Nusantara, which in his view is the moderate form of Islam compatible to Indonesian cultural values.

== History ==
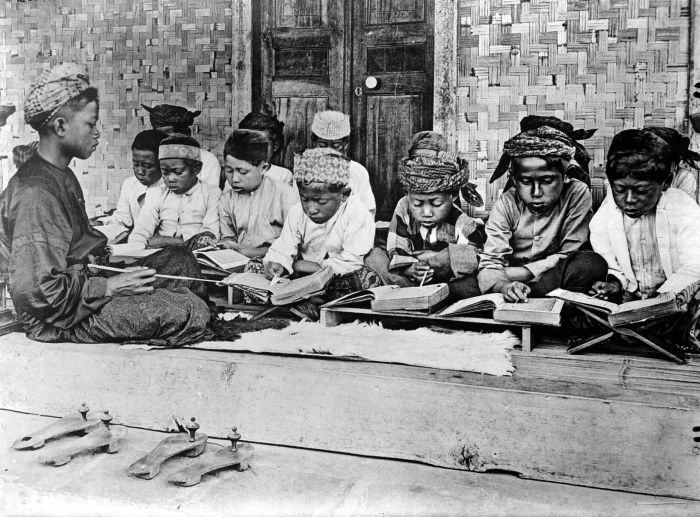
A traditionalist Islamic boarding school, known as a pesantren.

The spread of Islam in Indonesia was a slow, gradual and relatively peaceful process. One theory suggests it arrived directly from Arabia before the 9th century, while another credits Sufi merchants and preachers for bringing Islam to Indonesian islands in the 12th or 13th century either from Gujarat in India or directly from the Middle East. By the 16th century, Islam began to supplant Hinduism and Buddhism as the major faith in the archipelago. The traditional Islam in Indonesia mainly belongs to the Sunni branch, taught by revered clerics called kyai in pesantren boarding school, especially in Java. Some aspects of traditional Islam in Indonesia has incorporated local culture and customs.

Early practices of Indonesian Islam were more or less influenced by Sufism and existing local spiritualism. Several traditions, such as revering and recognizing the authority of kyai, honoring prominent Islamic figures such as the Wali Songo, and also taking part in Islamic traditions such as ziarah kubur (tomb pilgrimage), tahlilan (selamatan ceremony to send the spirit of deceased one to the afterworld), and maulid nabi (commemorating the prophet Muhammad's birthday) including Javanese sekaten ceremony, were observed diligently by traditionalist Muslims in Indonesia. However, after the incoming of Modernist Salafism followed by Wahhabism from Arabia, the scriptural Islamic puritans denounced those traditions as shirk or bid'ah, deprecated as a form of syncretism that corrupted the purity of Islam. This condition has led to the ongoing religious dispute, uneasy coexistence and somewhat a spiritual rivalry, between traditionalist Nahdlatul Ulama and modernist puritan Muhammadiyah.

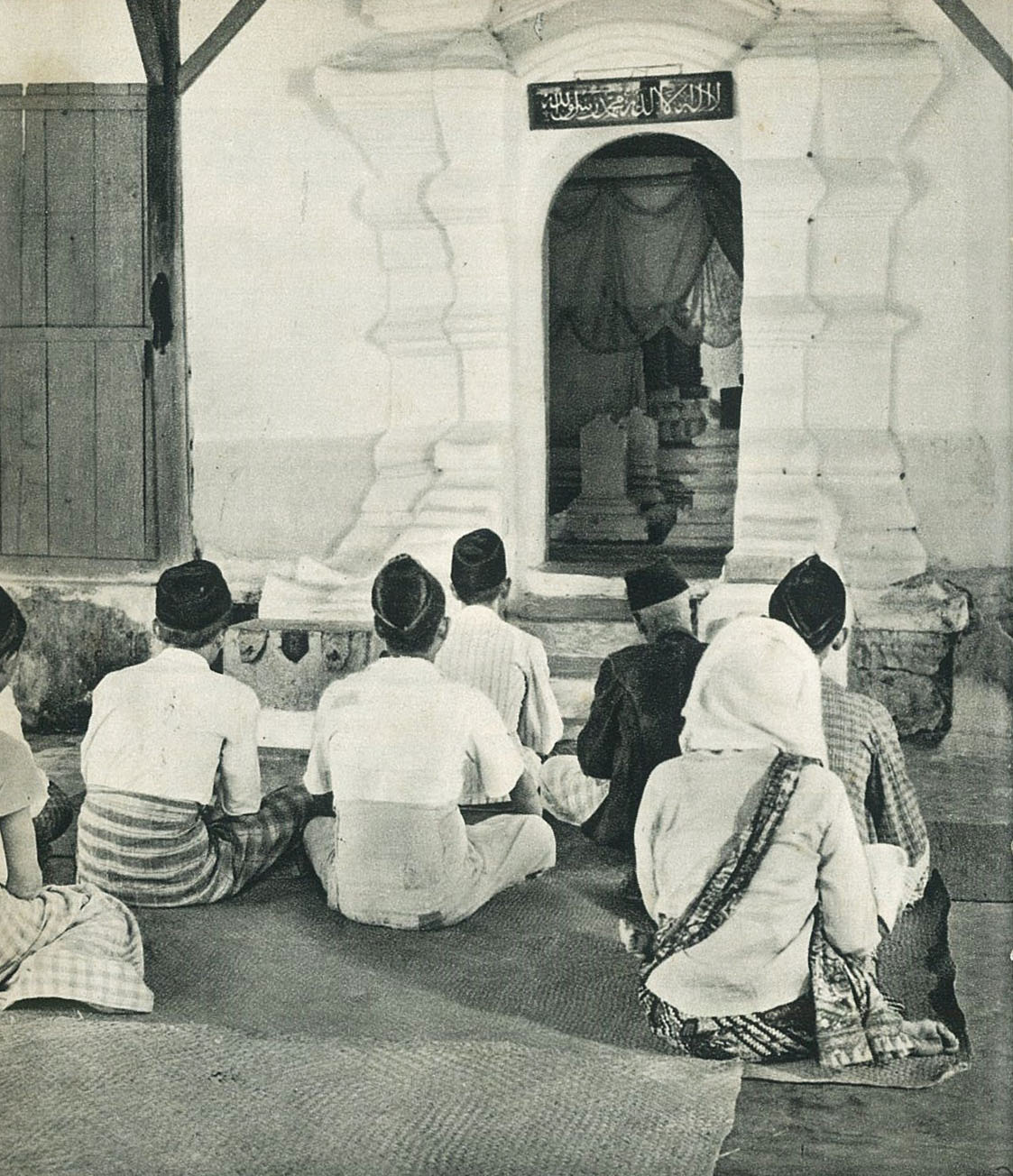
Ziarah kubur, visiting the tomb of prominent Islamic figure.

Examining the destruction of the war-torn Middle East; the Israeli–Palestinian conflict, Arab Spring, the Iraq War and the Syrian War, Indonesian moderate Islamic scholars noticed that some of these conflicts were having religious aspects, especially the problem of Islamic radicalism and extremism. Indonesia also has suffered several terrorist attacks that were launched by jihadist Islamist group such as Jamaah Islamiyah's attacks on Bali. The ultra conservative doctrine of Salafi and Wahhabi followed and promoted by the state of Saudi Arabia has dominated the global discourse of Islam for decades. The wary sentiments were aggravated further by the advent of ISIS in 2013 that performed abhorred war crimes in the name of Islam.

In recent years, there has been a rise of fundamentalism and religious intolerance in Indonesia. Internally, some of foreign and local Islamist organizations, such as Hizbut Tahrir Indonesia (HTI), Front Pembela Islam (FPI), and also Islamist political parties such as Partai Keadilan Sejahtera (PKS) have been actively involved in Indonesian politics in recent years, undermining the traditionalist Islamic institution especially Nahdlatul Ulama. Those Islamist elements in Indonesian politics are suspiciously regarded as weakening and harming the secular state ideology Pancasila.

Moderate Indonesian Muslim scholars, especially those traditionalist of Nahdlatul Ulama background, suggest that Indonesian Muslims are distinct; there is a difference between the Arabization and the traditional practice of Indonesian Islam. Compared to their Middle East Muslims counterpart, Indonesian Muslims has enjoyed a relative peace and harmony for decades. This was owed to Indonesians interpretation of Islam which is more moderate, inclusive and tolerant. Indonesia—as the world's largest Muslim population, could to contribute to the evolution of Islamic world, by offering its brand of Islam as an alternative to Saudi's Wahhabism. Thus subsequently, Islam Nusantara was identified, formulated, coined and promoted.

In March 2019, the Nahdlatul Ulama's Alim Ulama National Conference (Munas Alim Ulama NU) agreed on the definition of the concept of Islam Nusantara, and emphasized that Islam Nusantara Islam is not a new school, a new madhhab or a new sect, but an understanding of Islam that respects the culture and traditions of Nusantara (Indonesian archipelago).

== Characteristics ==
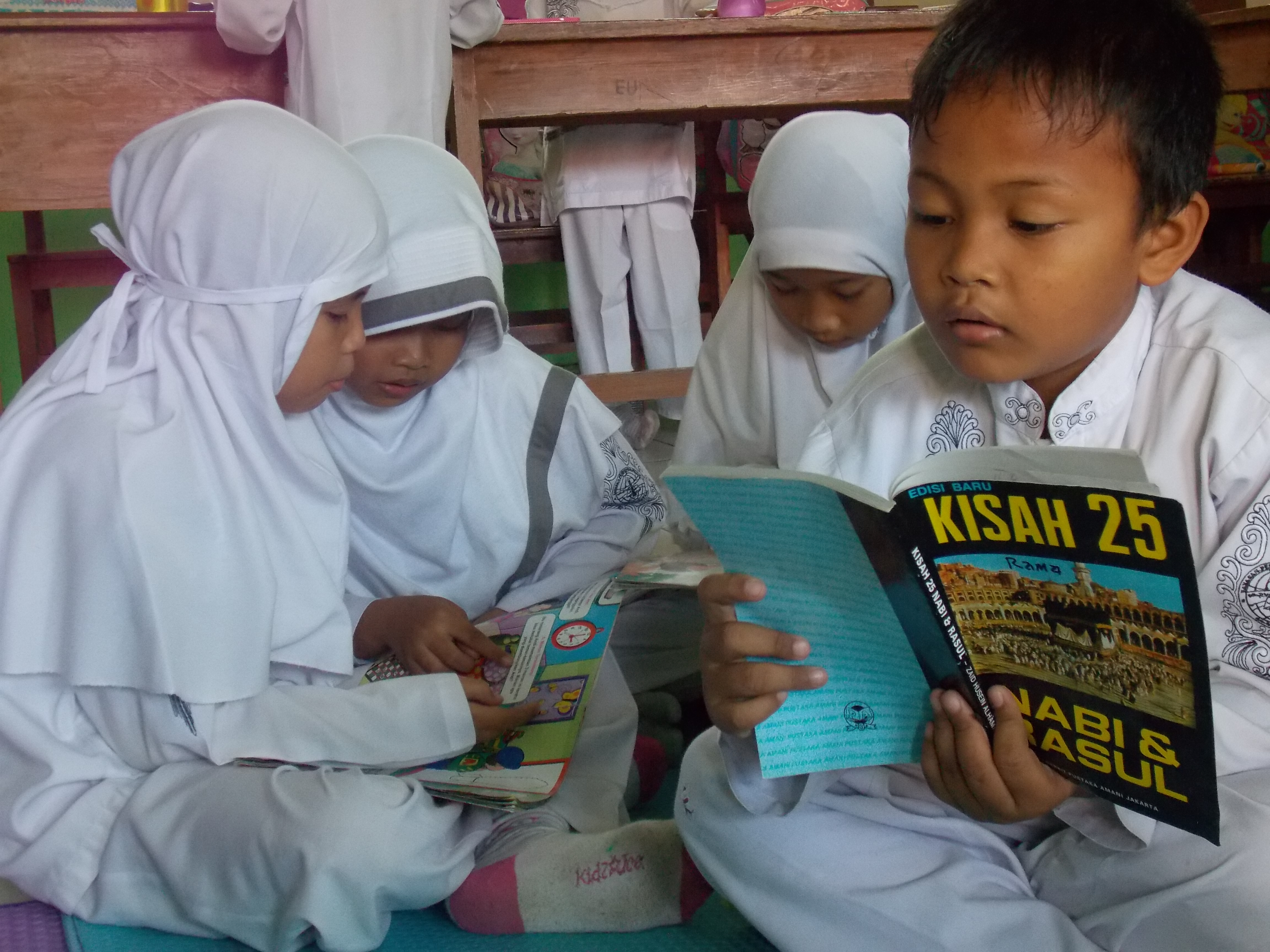
Boys and girls students are studying together in their classroom.

The main traits of Islam Nusantara are tawasut (moderate), rahmah (compassionate), anti-radical, inclusive and tolerant. Tawasut by "moderate" here connotes the Sunni Islamic theological position of wasatiyyah rather than political position. In its relations to local culture, Islam Nusantara uses a sympathetic cultural approach on teaching Islam; it did not destroy, disrupt or supplant the native culture, but on the contrary embraces, honor, nurture and preserves local culture. One of the main characteristic of Islam Nusantara is the consideration of local Indonesian culture in forming their fiqh (Islamic jurisprudence).

Islam Nusantara was developed locally in indigenous educational institutions of traditionalist pesantren boarding schools. As the result, it is based on traditional eastern notions of decorum and mannerism; it emphasizes honoring the status and authority of kyai or ulama (religious teacher). The students require the on-going guidance of their religious teacher, in order not to go astray or develop false or radical ideas. Another distinctive aspect is the emphasis on Rahmatan lil Alamin (blessings for the universe) as Islamic universal value, which promote peace, tolerance, mutual respects and a somewhat pluralist outlook in regard of Islamic interactions within ummah (within Muslim community) and in inter-religions relations.

== Criticism by fundamentalists ==
Islam Nusantara has been fiercely opposed and criticized by Islamic fundamentalists, especially by adherents of wahhabism and salafism, or other similar doctrine that seeks to "purify" Islam from any "un-Islamic" local elements, which are often condemned as shirk or bid'ah. Hizbut Tahrir Indonesia, PKS and FPI has openly opposed the Islam Nusantara. Islam Nusantara has been criticized as a somewhat syncretic form of Islam, which undermines the "perfectness" and singularity of Islam and corrupted the unity of the ummah.

Muhammadiyah, another influential Islamic organization in Indonesia—although not directly opposed to the concept, has stressed that the term Islam Nusantara should be addressed cautiously and proportionally, not to undermine and repress other branches of Islam, different understandings, or other doctrines of Islam. If Islam Nusantara is favoured, adopted, elevated and promoted by the state, they feared that other Islamic branches would suffer persecution and discrimination.

The opposition, such as the chief of West Sumatran Indonesian Ulema Council, Gusrizal Gazahar, argued that Islam Nusantara is an unnecessary addition to the "already perfect" Islam, and it is linked too closely or belongs to a certain group (i.e. Nahdlatul Ulama). There has been a circulating accusation that it might stray and develop to become a new religion. In response, in December 2019 the chief executive of the Nahdlatul Ulama, Robikin Emhas, emphasized that Islam Nusantara is not a new religion, and explained that it is a religious understanding that accommodates local wisdom and traditional Indonesian practices, that are not contrary to the teachings of Islam according to the quran and hadith.

== See also ==
- Islam in Southeast Asia
- Islamic culture
- Islamic schools and branches
- Political aspects of Islam
- Shu'ubiya
- Traditionalist theology
- Enlightened moderation
- Turkish model
- Wasatiyyah Institute Malaysia
