= Joraf =

Joraf is a city that was about 5 kilometers from Mecca, Saudi Arabia, in the 8th century. It was known for its large and varied fruit market. It was in this location that Usama's dispatchment was waiting for Umar and the others.
