= Ali Faisal Alfayadh =

Iraqi politician

Ali Faisal Alfayadh علي فيصل الفياض

Politician
- Incumbent
- Assumed office 2007

Personal details
- Born: 1963 (age 62–63) Baghdad, Iraq
- Party: State of Law Coalition
- Occupation: Politician, Member of the committee of Oil and Energy Parliament & Member of the Iraqi Council of Representatives

Ali Faisal Alfayadh (Arabic: علي فيصل الفياض) is an Iraqi politician, Member of the Committee of Oil and Energy Parliament & Member of the Iraqi Council of Representatives.

== Bio ==
Alfayadh,(Born in Baghdad 1963)is an Iraqi politician Member of the Committee of Oil and Energy Parliament & Member of the Iraqi Council of Representatives.He is brother Falih Alfayyadh.

== Positions ==
- Member of the Iraqi Council of Representatives since 2004.
- Member of the Committee of Oil and Energy Parliament since 2014.
