= Voice of Freedom =

Voice of Freedom may refer to:

- Voice of Freedom (radio station), an underground radio station in Portuguese Goa between 1955 and 1961
- "Voice of Freedom", a 1993 song by Freedom Williams
- The Voice of Freedom, a newspaper associated with the British political party British National Party
- Voice of Freedom: Fannie Lou Hamer, 2015 non-fiction children's book by Carole Boston Weatherford
- Voice of Freedom Party, an Egyptian political party
