= Ataa Movement =

Ataa Movement حركة عطاء
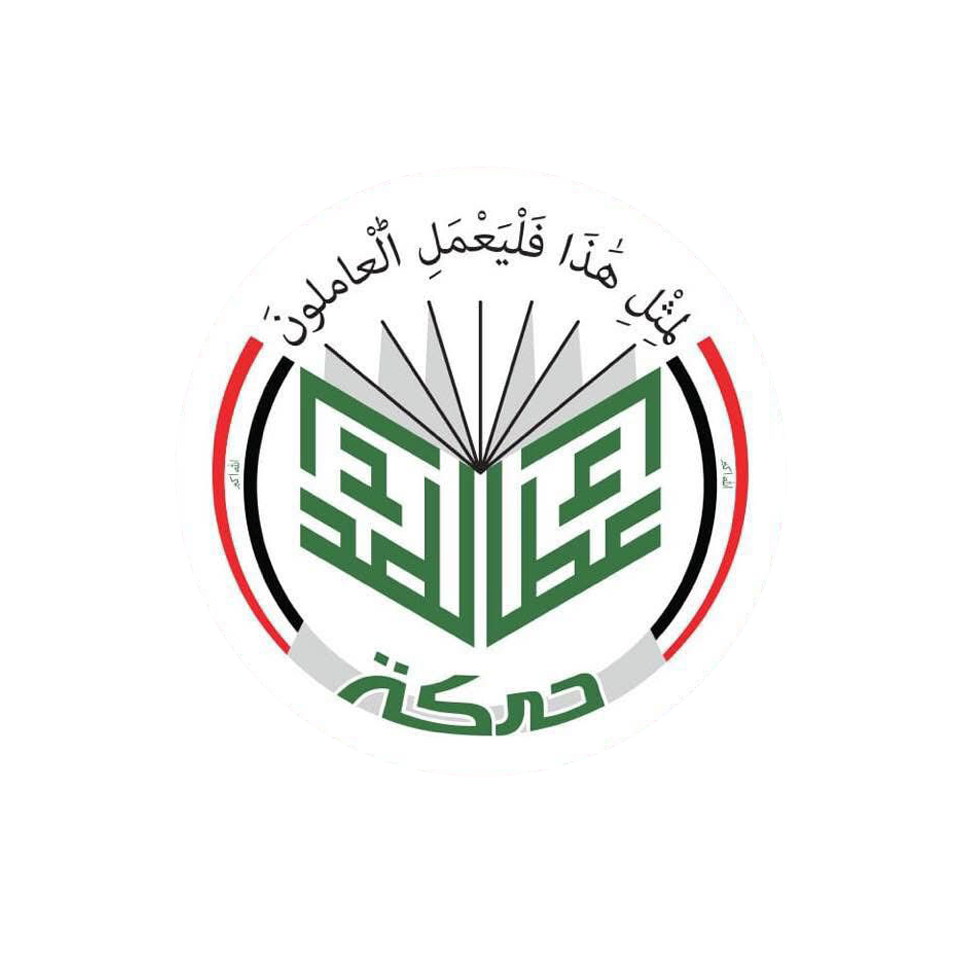
- Chairman: Falih Alfayyadh
- Founders: Falih Alfayyadh
- Founded: 2017; 9 years ago
- Headquarters: Baghdad
- Ideology: Islamic democracy
- Religion: Shia Islam
- National affiliation: Victory Alliance
- Colours: Green, red

The Ataa Movement (Arabic: حركة عطاء) is an Iraqi political party established by the head of the Popular Mobilization Forces and previous Iraqi National Security Advisor Falih Alfayyadh.

== History ==
The founding members of the party met in 2017, and the first nucleus of a "Ataa movement" was founded on a body composed of 8 members. Falih Alfayyadh played a key role in the movement's leadership committee, which was formed to create an ideological equilibrium with communism, secularism, Arab nationalism and other ideas.

== See also ==
- List of Islamic political parties
