= Union of Muslim Ulama =

The Union of Muslim Ulama (Arabic: تجمع العلماء المسلمين) emerged in 1982, when West Beirut was under siege by the Israel Defense Forces (IDF).

It included Sunni and Shi'a clerics who shared the view that the application of sharia would solve Lebanon's problems and would end the IDF's occupation of Arab land.

The union's fundamentalist line reflected its identification with the policies and objectives of Iran.

The Union of Muslim Ulama, which was unique because of its combined Sunni-Shia membership, strove to eliminate tensions between the two communities. For that reason, it organized mass rallies to propagate its views to the broadest audience possible.

In 1987 the union was led by Shaykh Mahir Hammud (a Sunni) and Shaykh Zuhayr Kanj (a Shia).

== See also ==
- List of Islamic political parties
- Ahmad al-Zein
