= Enlightened moderation =

Anti-extremist Islamic school of thought, created by Pervez Musharraf

Enlightened moderation is a term coined by a former Pakistani president, Pervez Musharraf; it applies to practicing a moderate Islam, as opposed to the interpretations of fundamentalist Islam.

To think properly as to rationalise thoughts, to be on the positive side of life and to prefer optimism, the theory goes, is to be against extremism.

The strategy of enlightened moderation was unveiled by Musharraf during the 2002 OIC Summit Conference in Malaysia.

Musharraf explained his position in an opinion piece that was published in various newspapers in 2004. His plan for enlightened moderation has two sides. It calls "for the Muslim world to shun militancy and extremism and adopt the path of socioeconomic uplift" and "for the West, and the United States in particular, to seek to resolve all political disputes with justice and to aid in the socioeconomic betterment of the deprived Muslim world".

Musharraf pointed out that moderation and enlightenment have been the traits of the Islamic world since the times of Muhammad.

Musharraf wrote:

I say to my brother Muslims: The time for renaissance has come. The way forward is through enlightenment. We must concentrate on human resource development through the alleviation of poverty and through education, health care and social justice. If this is our direction, it cannot be achieved through confrontation. We must adopt a path of moderation and a conciliatory approach to fight the common belief that Islam is a religion of militancy in conflict with modernisation, democracy and secularism. All this must be done with a realisation that, in the world we live in, fairness does not always rule.

== Criticism ==
Fundamentalist Islamic organisations have criticised Musharraf's vision of enlightened moderation. The Jamaat-e-Islami condemns it as a neologism for Westernisation and American imperialism. Islam is innately a religion of enlightened moderation, they argue, and needs no Westernised amendments. Masooda Bano says that the US is not likely to "suddenly metamorphose into a benevolent entity, which will 'resolve all political disputes with justice.'"

== See also ==
- Secularism in Pakistan
- Islam Nusantara
- Madkhalism
- Turkish model
