= Ahmad al-Zein =

Sunni Muslim scholar (1933–2021)

- أحمد الزین
- Title: Shaykh

Personal life
- Born: 1933 Sidon, French Lebanon
- Died: 2 March 2021 (aged 87–88)
- Era: Modern
- Region: Lebanon

Religious life
- Religion: Islam
- Denomination: Sunni
- Movement: Union of Muslim Ulama

Muslim leader
- Influenced: Musa al-Sadr

Ahmad al-Zein (Arabic: أحمد الزین; 1933–2021) was a Sunni Muslim scholar who was also known as "Shaykh of the Levant". He was the head of the Union of Muslim Ulama of Lebanon.

== Early life ==
He was born in 1933 in the city of Sidon in southern Lebanon. Ahmad al-Zein was a graduate of Al-Azhar University in Egypt and was the religious judge of the Lebanese Sharia courts for 35 years and the Friday Imam of the Omri Kabir Mosque in Sidon. He was one of Lebanon's Sunni scholars, a member of The World Forum for Proximity of Islamic Schools of Thought.

== Death ==
He died on March 2, 2021, at the age of 88.
