= Al Ansar Party =

Political party in Egypt

Al-Ansar Party حزب الأنصار
- Leader: Gamal Saber
- Ideology: Salafism
- House of Representatives: 0 / 568

The Al-Ansar Party is a political party in Egypt. It is one of three parties that are part of Hazem Salah Abu Ismail's network of political parties; the other two parties are the Egyptian Nation Party and the Flag Party. The party would have been part of a coalition including the People Party, the Building and Development Party and the Virtue Party; however Hazem Salah Abu Ismail formed a coalition called the Nation Alliance without the Al Ansar Party.

== See also ==
- List of Islamic political parties
