= Voice of Freedom Party =

Political party in Egypt

Voice of Freedom Party Sout Al-Horeyya
- Leader: Essam Serry
- House of Representatives: 0 / 568

The Voice of Freedom Party (Arabic: حزب صوت الحرية, Ḥizb Ṣawt al-Ḥurriyyah) is a Sufi Islamist political party in Egypt The party is backed by the Rifa'i Sufi order, which is the largest Sufi order in Egypt.

== See also ==
- List of Islamic political parties
