= Iraqi Feyli Islamic Council =

- Leader: Muqdad al Baghdadi
- Founded: 2004
- Headquarters: Najaf, Iraq
- Ideology: Feyli interests Shia Islamism; Clericalism; Regionalism; Theocracy
- Political position: Far-Right
- Religion: Shi'a Islam
- National affiliation: Islamic Coalition

Iraqi Feyli Islamic Council (Arabic: التجمع الفيلي العراقي الاسلامي; Kurdish: ئەنجومەنی فەیلیی عێراقیی ئیسلامی) is Shia Islamist political party in Iraq made up of Feyli Kurds. It is led by Muqdad Al-Baghdadi.

Its roots emerged in the 1990s in the aftermath of the 1991 Iraqi uprisings, when the Iraqi government cracked down on the Feyli Kurds and other opposition groups. The group has since become an important player in Iraqi politics, particularly in the eastern provinces of Diyala and Wasit, where the Feyli Kurds are concentrated.

The party has participated in Iraqi elections and has formed alliances with other political parties. The group has also sought to build ties with Iran, which has a significant Shia population and has historically supported Shia political groups in Iraq. In 2017, the party's leader, Muqdad al-Baghdadi, received guests from the Shirazi International Foundation.

== See also ==
- List of Islamic political parties
