= List of Islamic political parties =

Below are lists of political parties espousing Islamic identity or political Islam in various approaches under the system of Islamic democracy. Islamic democracy refers to a political ideology that seeks to apply Islamic principles to public policy within a democratic framework. Lists are categorized by the ideological affiliation and sorted by the country of origin.

== Islamic democratic centrist, liberal, moderate, and progressive ==
This is a list of political parties espousing Islam as its main identity without principal adherence to the particular ideology of political Islam, or taking a theological position of wasat which advocates for politico-religious centrism, Islamic democracy, Third Way, progressivism and liberalism.

Country	Logo	Name	Abbr.	Leader	Founded	Ideology	Lower House
Bangladesh		Bangladesh Jamaat-e-Islami বাংলাদেশ জামায়াতে ইসলামী	BJI	Shafiqur Rahman	1979	Islamism; Social conservatism	Jatiya Sangsad: 76 / 350
Bosnia and Herzegovina		Party of Democratic Action; Bosnian: Stranka demokratske akcije	SDA	Bakir Izetbegović	26 May 1990	Bosniak nationalism Conservatism; Pro-Europeanism; Islamism; Big tent	House of Representatives: 9 / 42
India		Indian Union Muslim League इण्डियन यूनियन मुस्लिम लीग	IUML	K. M. Kader Mohideen	10 March 1948	Social conservatism Centrism	House of the People 13 / 543
India		All India Majlis-e-Ittehadul Muslimeen ऑल इंडिया मजलिस-ए-इत्तेहादुल मुस्लिमीन	AIMIM	Asaduddin Owaisi	12 November 1927	Secularism; Social Justice	House of the People 11 / 543
India		All India United Democratic Front सर्व भारत संयुक्त गणतांत्रिक मोर्चा	AIUDF	Badruddin Ajmal	2 October 2005	National Inclusiveness; Minority rights	House of the People 11 / 543
India		Indian Secular Front भारतीय धर्मनिरपेक्ष मोर्चा	ISF	Abbas Siddiqui	21 January 2021	Minority rights	House of the People 12 / 543
Indonesia		National Awakening Party; Partai Kebangkitan Bangsa	PKB	Muhaimin Iskandar	9 July 1998	Pancasila; Pluralism; Nationalism; Islamic democracy Islamic liberalism	People's Representative Council: 68 / 580
Iraq		Kurdistan Justice Group كۆمەڵی دادگەری كوردستان	KJP	Ali Bapir	2001	Islamic democracy Kurdish nationalism Social Justice	Council of Representatives: 16 / 328
Jordan		Islamic Centrist Party حزب الوسط الاسلامي	ICS	Madalla al-Tarawneh	December 2001	Islamic democracy Arab nationalism Centrism	House of Representatives: 5 / 130
Libya		National Forces Alliance تحالف القوى الوطنية	NFA	Salaheddin El Bishari	2012	Libyan nationalism Islamic democracy Big tent Economic; Liberalism	General National Congress: 39 / 200
Malaysia		United Malays National Organisation ڤرتوبوهن كبڠساءن ملايو برساتو	UMNO	Ahmad Zahid Hamidi	11 May 1946	Ketuanan Melayu; Malay nationalism National conservatism	House of Representatives: 26 / 222
Malaysia		National Trust Party (Malaysia) ڤرتي أمانه نڬارا	AMANAH	Mohamad Sabu	16 September 2015	Social justice Progressivism; Islamic modernism Islamic democracy	House of Representatives: 8 / 222
Maldives		Maldivian Democratic Party ދިވެހިރައްޔިތުންގެ ޑިމޮކްރެޓިކް ޕާޓީ	MDP	Abdulla Shahid	10 November 2003	Liberal conservatism Islamic democracy Parliamentarism; Environmentalism	People's Majlis: 12 / 93
Maldives		Maldives National Party މޯލްޑިވްސް ނޭޝަނަލް ޕާޓީ	MNP	Mohamed Nazim	July 2021	Islamic democracy Nationalism	People's Majlis: 1 / 93
Maldives		People's National Congress ޕީޕަލްސް ނެޝަނަލް ކޮންގްރެސް	PNC	Mohamed Muizzu	31 January 2019	Conservatism; Religious nationalism	People's Majlis: 75 / 93
Pakistan		Jamaat-e-Islami (Pakistan) جماعتِ اسلامی	JI	Hafiz Naeem ur Rehman	30 November 1967	Pan-Islamism; Islamic democracy Anti communism	National Assembly: 0 / 342
Pakistan		Jamiat Ulema-e-Islam	JUI	Moulana Fazal-ur-Rehman	26 October 1945	Islamism Islamic fundamentalism Religious nationalism Religious conservatism	National Assembly: 7 / 342
Philippines		Lakas–CMD; Lakas–Demokratang Kristiyano at Muslim	Lakas	Martin Romualdez	1991	Christian democracy Islamic democracy Liberal conservatism Filipino nationalism Federalism; Parliamentarism; Centrism; Conservatism	House of Representatives: 76 / 317 Senate: 1 / 24
Rwanda		Ideal Democratic Party; Parti Démocratique Idéal	PDI	Mussa Harerimana	1992	Islamic democracy Centrism	Chamber of Deputies: 2 / 80
Sri Lanka		Sri Lanka Muslim Congress ශ්‍රී ලංකා මුස්ලිම් කොංග්‍රසය ஸ்ரீலங்கா முஸ்லீம் காங்கிரஸ்	SLMC	Rauff Hakeem	1981	Muslim minority politics	Parliament of Sri Lanka: 5 / 225
Sri Lanka		All Ceylon Makkal Congress සමස්ත ලංකා මහජන කොංග්‍රසය அகில இலங்கை மக்கள் காங்கிரஸ்	ACMC	Rishad Bathiudeen	2005	Muslim minority politics	Parliament of Sri Lanka: 3 / 225
Tunisia		Ennahda حركة النهضة	Enhada	Rached Ghannouchi	1981	Social conservatism Economic liberalism Islamic democracy	0 / 161
Turkey		Felicity Party; Saadet Partisi	SAADET	Temel Karamollaoğlu	23 November 2018	Milli Görüş; Conservatism; Social conservatism Islamic fundamentalism	Grand National Assembly: 20 / 600
Turkey		Future Party; Gelecek Partisi	GP	Ahmet Davutoğlu	2019	Conservatism; Liberal conservatism Conservative liberalism Economic liberalism Pro-Europeanism	Grand National Assembly: 0 / 600
Turkey		Justice and Development Party; Adalet ve Kalkınma Partisi	AK PARTİ	Recep Tayyip Erdoğan	14 August 2001	Conservatism; Social conservatism National conservatism Right-wing populism Neo-Ottomanism; Illiberalism; Erdoğanism; Euroscepticism	Grand National Assembly: 266 / 600

=== Banned parties ===
Afghanistan

- National Islamic Movement of Afghanistan

Iran

- Islamic Iran Participation Front

=== Non-legislature notable parties ===
Algeria

- Islamic Renaissance Movement (part of Green Algeria Alliance)
- Movement for Democracy in Algeria

Bahrain

- Al-Menbar Islamic Society

Bangladesh

- Bangladesh Islami Front
- Islami Oikya Jote

Egypt

- Al-Wasat Party

India

- Peace Party of India

Indonesia

- Crescent Star Party
- Gelora Party

Iran

- Union of Islamic Iran People Party
- Moderation and Development Party

Iraq

- Islamic Action Organisation
- Islamic Dawa Party (part of National Iraqi Alliance)
- Islamic Fayli Grouping in Iraq
- Islamic Labour Movement in Iraq
- Islamic Union of Iraqi Turkoman

The Netherlands

- Islam Democrats

Philippines

- Bangsamoro Party (Moro National Liberation Front)
- United Bangsamoro Justice Party (Moro Islamic Liberation Front)

== Islamist ==
=== Sunni ===
This is a list of political parties espousing Sunni Islamism as its main ideology.

Country	Logo	Name	Abbr.	Leader	Founded	Ideology	Lower House
Algeria		Movement of Society for Peace حركة مجتمع السلم	MSP	Abderrazak Makri	6 December 1990	Sunni Islamism; Islamic democracy Social conservatism Economic liberalism	People's National Assembly: 43 / 407
Algeria		National Construction Movement حركة البناء الوطني	NCM	Abdelkader Bengrina	March 2013	Islamic democracy Algerian nationalism	People's National Assembly: 40 / 407
Algeria		Justice and Development Front جبهة العدالة والتنمية	JDF	Abdallah Djaballah	2011	Islamic democracy Algerian nationalism	People's National Assembly: 4 / 407
Indonesia		Prosperous Justice Party; Partai Keadilan Sejahtera	PKS	Al Muzzammil Yusuf	20 July 1998	Pancasila; Islamism; Social conservatism	People's Representative Council: 53 / 580
Iraq		Iraqi Islamic Party الحزب الاسلامي العراقي	IIP	Rashid al-Azzawi	26 April 1960	Islamic democracy Qutbism	Council of Representatives of Iraq: 7 / 329
Iraq		Kurdistan Islamic Union; Yekgirtuy Islami Kurdistan	KIU	Salaheddine Bahaaeddin	1994	Islamic democracy Kurdish nationalism	Council of Representatives of Iraq: 4 / 329 Kurdistan Parliament: 5 / 111
Iraq		Uniters for Reform Coalition الحراك الشعبي في العراق	Muttahidoon	Usama al-Nujayfi	December 2012	Regionalism; Islamic democracy Populism	Council of Representatives of Iraq: 16 / 329
Israel		United Arab List (Hebrew: הַרְשִׁימָה הַעֲרָבִית הַמְאוּחֶדֶת, HaReshima HaAravit HaMe'uhedet; Arabic: القائمة العربية الموحدة, al-Qā'ima al-'Arabiyya al-Muwaḥḥada), commonly known by its Hebrew acronym Ra'am (Hebrew: רע"מ, lit. 'Thunder')	Ra'am	Mansour Abbas	1996	Conservatism; Islamism; Social conservatism	Knesset: 5 / 120
Jordan		Islamic Action Front جبهة العمل الإسلامي	IAF	Hamza Mansour	1992	Islamism; Islamic democracy	House of Representatives: 10 / 130
Jordan		National Congress Party (Zamzam) حزب المؤتمر الوطني	Zamzam زمزم	Rheil Gharaibeh	2016	Islamism; Islamic democracy	House of Representatives: 5 / 130
Lebanon		Islamic Group الجماعة الإسلامية	JI	Azzam Al-Ayyoubi	1964	Sunni Islamism; Pan-Islamism; Social conservatism	Lebanese Parliament: 1 / 128
Libya		Justice and Construction Party حزب العدالة والبناء	JCP	Emad al-Banani	3 March 2012	Islamic democracy Islamism	General National Congress: 17 / 200
Malaysia		Malaysian Islamic Party; Parti Islam Se-Malaysia	PAS	Abdul Hadi Awang	24 November 1951	Islamism; Islamic conservatism Islamic fundamentalism Jihadism; Pan-Islamism; Shariaism	House of Representatives: 43 / 222
Maldives		Jumhooree Party ޖުމްހޫރީ ޕާޓީ	JP	Qasim Ibrahim	26 May 2008	Islamic democracy Nationalism; Social conservatism	People's Majlis: 1 / 93
Maldives		People's National Congress ޕީޕަލްސް ނެޝެނަލް ކޮންގްރެސް	PNC	Mohamed Muizzu	31 January 2019	Conservatism; Islamism	People's Majlis: 75 / 93
Maldives		Maldives Development Alliance މޯލްޑިވްސް ޑިވެލޮޕްމަންޓް އެލަޔަންސް	MDA	Ahmed Shiyam Mohamed	20 December 2012	Economic liberalism Political Islam	People's Majlis: 2 / 93
Mauritania		National Rally for Reform and Development التجمع الوطني للإصلاح و التنمية	RNRD	Hamadi Ould Sid'El Moctar	2007	Sunni Islamism; Islamic democracy Religious conservatism	National Assembly: 14 / 146
Morocco		Justice and Development Party; Parti de la justice et du développement	JDP PJD	Abdelilah Benkirane	1967	Islamic democracy Social conservatism Conservatism; Moroccan nationalism	House of Representatives: 13 / 395
Pakistan		Jamiat Ulema-e Islam (F) جمیعت علماءِ اسلام	JUI	Maulana Fazl-ur-Rehman	1945	Islamism; Social conservatism Religious nationalism Religious conservatism	National Assembly: 14 / 342
Pakistan		Jamaat-e-Islami Pakistan جماعتِ اسلامی	JIP	Siraj ul Haq	26 August 1941	Islamism; Islamic revivalism Social conservatism Pan-Islamism; Islamic democracy Anti-capitalism; Anti-communism; Anti-liberalism	National Assembly: 1 / 342 Sindh Assembly: 1 / 168
Palestine		Islamic Resistance Movement حركة المقاومة الإسلامية	Hamas	Temporary committee	December 10, 1987	Palestinian nationalism Islamism; Religious nationalism Anti-Zionism	Legislative Council: 74 / 132
Somaliland		Somaliland National Party; Xisbiga Waddani	Waddani	Hersi Ali Haji Hassan	2012	Nationalism; Populism; Islamic democracy	House of Representatives: 31 / 82
Turkey		Felicity Party; Saadet Partisi	SAADET	Mahmut Arıkan	20 July 2001	Millî Görüş; Islamism; Social conservatism Religious nationalism	Grand National Assembly: 20 / 600
Turkey		Great Unity Party; Büyük Birlik Partisi	BBP	Mustafa Destici	29 January 1993	Turkish Islamonationalism; Sunni Islamism; Turkish nationalism Turkish ultranationalism Social conservatism	Grand National Assembly: 0 / 600
Turkey		Free Cause Party; Hür Dava Partisi	HUDAPAR	Zekeriya Yapıcıoğlu	17 December 2012	Kurdish-Islamic synthesis Sunni Islamism; Kurdish Nationalism; Federalism	Grand National Assembly: 4 / 600
Turkey		New Welfare Party; Yeniden Refah Partisi	YRP	Fatih Erbakan	23 November 2018	Millî Görüş; Islamism; Islamic fundamentalism Anti-feminism; Neo Ottomanism; Anti-LGBT; Ultraconservatism	Grand National Assembly: 4 / 600

==== Banned Sunni parties: ====
Afghanistan

- Hezb-e Islami Gulbuddin
- Hezb-i Islami Khalis
- Jamiat-e Islami
- Islamic Dawah Organisation of Afghanistan

Algeria

- Islamic Salvation Front

Indonesia

- Masyumi Party

Tajikistan

- Islamic Renaissance Party of Tajikistan

Turkey

- National Order Party
- Virtue Party
- Welfare Party

Uzbekistan

- Islamic Renaissance Party of Uzbekistan

==== Non-legislature notable Sunni parties ====
Algeria

- Movement for National Reform

Bangladesh

- Islamic Front Bangladesh
- Bangladesh Islami Front

Egypt

- Freedom and Justice Party
- Building and Development Party
- Islamic Party

Indonesia

- United Development Party
- Ummah Party

Kuwait

- Hadas

Lebanon

- Islamic Labor Front
- Islamic Unification Movement
- Hizb ut-Tahrir, Najjadeh Party

Libya

- Homeland Party

Maldives

- Adhaalath Party
- Progressive Party of Maldives
- People's National Front

Pakistan

- Jamiat Ahle Hadith

Syria

- Muslim Brotherhood of Syria

==== Defunct notable Sunni parties ====
China — East Turkestan

- Committee for National Revolution

Indonesia

- Indonesian People's Da'wah Party

Turkey

- National Development Party
- National Salvation Party

Maldives

- Dhivehi Rayyithunge Party
- Islamic Democratic Party

=== Shia ===
This is a list of political parties espousing Shia Islamism as its main ideology.

Country	Logo	Name	Abbr.	Leader	Founded	Ideology	Lower House
Iraq		Islamic Supreme Council of Iraq المجلس الأعلى الإسلامي العراقي	ISCI	Humam Hamoudi	1982	Sistanism; Shia Islamism; Islamic democracy Decentralization; Iraqi nationalism	Council of Representatives of Iraq: 2 / 329
Iraq		Islamic Dawa Party حزب الدعوة الاسلامية	IDP	Hashim Al-Mosawy	1998	Shia Islamism; Clericalism; Islamic fundamentalism	Council of Representatives of Iraq: 5 / 329
Iraq		Islamic Virtue Party ائتلاف الفتح	IVP	Ammar Tu'ma Abd-Abbas	1991	Islamism; Anti-Zionism	Council of Representatives of Iraq: 9 / 329
Iraq		State of Law Coalition إئتلاف دولة القانون	SLC	Nouri al-Maliki	2009	Populism; Big tent Anti-secularism; Statism; Anti-corruption	Council of Representatives of Iraq: 33 / 329
Iraq		Fatah Alliance ائتلاف الفتح	Fatah	Hadi Al-Amiri	2018	Shia Islamism; Big tent Pro-Iran; Anti-secularism; Anti-corruption; Factions: Anti-Americanism; Anti-Zionism; Vilayat-e Faqih	Council of Representatives of Iraq: 17 / 329
Kuwait		National Islamic Alliance التحالف الوطني الإسلامي	NIA	Adnan Zahid Abdulsamad	1988	Islamism	National Assembly: 1 / 65
Lebanon		Hezbollah حزب الله	Hezbollah	Nasim Qassem	1985	Islamic nationalism Pan-Islamism; Anti-Zionism; Anti-imperialism; Shia Jihad; Khomeinism; Anti-West; Antisemitism	Parliament: 13 / 128

==== Banned Shia parties ====
Afghanistan

- Islamic Unity Party of Afghanistan
- People's Islamic Unity Party of Afghanistan
- Islamic Movement of Afghanistan
- National Islamic Unity Party
- Islamic Movement of Afghanistan
- National Solidarity Party

Iran

- People's Mujahedin of Iran

==== Non-legislature notable Shia parties ====
Bahrain

- Bahrain Freedom Movement
- Islamic Action Society

Belgium

- ISLAM

Kuwait

- Justice and Peace Alliance

Lebanon

- Free Shia Movement
- Union of Muslim Ulama

Iran

- Alliance of Builders of Islamic Iran
- Islamic Coalition Party

Iraq

- National Iraqi Alliance
- Al-Muwatin
- Al-Sadiqoun Bloc
- Ataa Movement
- Eradaa Movement
- Hezbollah Movement in Iraq
- Islamic Action Organisation
- Islamic Fayli Grouping in Iraq
- Islamic Supreme Council of Iraq
- National Reform Trend

Pakistan

- Tehrik-e-Jafaria

==== Defunct notable Shia parties ====
Azerbaijan

- Islamic Party of Azerbaijan

Bahrain

- Al Wefaq
- Islamic Action Society

== Salafist ==
This is a list of political parties espousing Salafism as its main ideology.

Country	Logo	Name	Abbr.	Leader	Founded	Ideology	Lower House
Bahrain		Al Asalah جمعية الأصالة الإسلامية	AIS	Ghanim Al-Buaneen	5 June 2002	Salafism; Islamism	Council of Representatives: 3 / 40
Egypt		Al-Nour Party حزب النور	NP	Yunis Makhyun	12 May 2011	Salafism; Islamism; Wahhabism; Madkhalism	House of Representatives: 7 / 596
Pakistan		Muttahida Majlis-e-Amal متحدہ مجلسِ عمل	MMA	Fazl-ur-Rahman	2002	Islamism; Conservatism; Social conservatism	National Assembly: 15 / 342
Yemen		Al-Islah التجمع اليمني للإصلاح	YCR	Abdullah ibn Husayn al-Ahmar	13 September 1990	Sunni Islamism; Salafism; Tribalism	House of Representatives: 44 / 301
Sudan		National Congress Party حزب المؤتمر الوطني	NCP	Omar al-Bashir	1998	Arab–Islamic nationalism Salafism; Social conservatism Authoritarianism; Militarism; Anti-Americanism; Anti-Zionism; Right-wing populism	National Assembly: 323 / 426

=== Banned Salafist parties ===
Afghanistan

- Islamic Dawah Organisation of Afghanistan

=== Non-legislature Salafist parties ===
Egypt

- Al Ansar Party, People Party

Maldives

- Adhaalath Party

Tunisia

- Justice and Development Party

=== Defunct Salafist parties ===
East Turkestan

- Young Kashgar Party

== Sufism and Ash'arism ==
Country	Logo	Name	Abbr.	Leader	Founded	Ideology	Lower House
Bangladesh		Bangladesh Tarikat Federation বাংলাদেশ তরিকত ফেডারেশন	BTF	Syed Nazibul Bashar Maizvandary	2005	Secularism; Islamic democracy Conservatism; Economic liberalism	House of the Nation: 1 / 350
Lebanon		The Association of Islamic Charitable Projects (Al-Ahbash) جمعية المشاريع الخيرية الإسلامية	AICP	Shaykh Hussam Qaraqira	1983	Religious pluralism Islamic neo-traditionalism Apolitical; Anti-Salafi	Parliament: 2 / 128

=== Non-legislature parties ===
Egypt – Egyptian Liberation Party, Victory Party, Voice of Freedom Party, Egyptian Liberation Party

== Islamic socialist ==
This is a list of political parties espousing Islamic Socialism as its main ideology.

Country	Logo	Name	Abbr.	Leader	Founded	Ideology	Lower House
Pakistan		Majlis Wahdat-e-Muslimeen مجلس وحدتِ مسلمین	MWM	Allama Raja Nasir Abbas	2 August 2009	Islamic democracy Islamic socialism Shi'a–Sunni unity	Gilgit-Baltistan Assembly: 1 / 33
Pakistan		Pakistan Tehreek-e-Insaf پاکستان تحريکِ انصاف	PTI	Imran Khan	25 April 1996	Islamic democracy Islamic socialism Welfare state Populism; Environmentalism; Social justice Civic nationalism	National Assembly: 0 / 342
Pakistan		Jamaat-e-Islami Pakistan جماعت اسلامی پاکستان	JIP	Hafiz Naeem ur Rehman	26 August 1941	Islamic democracy Islamic socialism	Sindh Assembly: 0 / 33

=== Banned socialist parties ===
Libya

- Libyan Popular National Movement

=== Non-legislature socialist parties ===
Bangladesh

- Bangladesh Freedom Party

Egypt

- Egyptian Arab Socialist Party
- Egyptian Islamic Labour Party
- Egyptian Liberation Party
- Social Justice Party
- Umma Party
- Young Egypt Party

Pakistan

- Qaumi Watan Party

Sudan

- Islamic Socialist Party

=== Defunct socialist parties ===
Indonesia

- Indonesian Islamic Party
- Indonesian Islamic Union Party

Iran

- Office for the Cooperation of the People with the President

Mauritania

- Mauritanian People's Party

Russia

- Muslim Socialist Committee of Kazan

Somalia

- Somali Revolutionary Socialist Party

Syria

- Socialist Cooperation Party

== See also ==
- Islamic democracy
- Political aspects of Islam
- Islam Yes, Islamic Party No
