= Shia view of Umar =

Negative view of Umar, Muhammad's Companion

Umar ibn al-Khattab was one of the earliest figures in the history of Islam. While Sunnis regard Umar ibn al-Khattab in high esteem and respect his place as one of the "Four Righteously Guided Caliphs", the Shia do not view him as a legitimate leader of the Ummah and believe that Umar and Abu Bakr conspired to usurp power from Ali. This belief arises from the Incident of Saqifa as well the hadith of the pen and paper. Shia believe that the Sunni view of Umar was created by the later Umayyad dynasty to honour the man that gave power to the first Umayyad ruler and third Sunni Caliph, Uthman. In this way, it gives legitimacy to Umar's consultation that started their own dynasty. Shia believe that the Umayyad view was propagated with lethal force and heavy duress and as time went on, that view became predominant and was cemented by the works of Bukhari.

== Shi'a biography ==
=== Embracing Islam ===
A Sh'ia scholar states:

Some historians claim that Umar was a most awe-inspiring man, and when he accepted Islam, the idolaters were gripped with fear for their lives. But this is only a case of a dominant myth being in conflict with ugly facts. When Umar accepted Islam, the idolaters remained where they were, and nothing changed for them; but it was Muhammad who was compelled to leave his home, and had to find sanctuary in a desolate ravine. He spent three years in that ravine, and during those years of exile, his life was exposed to deadly perils every day and every night. During this entire period of more than 1000 days, Umar, like many other Muslims in Makkah, was the silent spectator of the ordeals of his master. He made no attempt to bring those ordeals to an end.

=== Hafsa bint Umar ===
Hafsa, the daughter of Umar, was originally married to Khunais ibn Hudhaifa. When he died, Umar sought to find a husband for her. He approached his friend Uthman who said "I am of the opinion that I shall not marry at present", after thinking about the proposal for a few days. Umar became angry with Uthman and asked Abu Bakr the same thing. Abu Bakr did not give him a reply, causing Umar to become even more angry with him than he was with Uthman. Umar then went to Muhammad to discuss the previous two incidents. Muhammad reassured Umar by saying that "Hafsa will marry one better than Uthman and Uthman will marry one better than Hafsa." Umar was obviously alluding to the fact that Hafsa was to marry Muhammad and that Uthman was to marry a daughter of Muhammad.

Hafsa was married to Muhammad in 625. Muhammad's household was not always peaceful as his wives were in two groups. Umar said on one occasion:

"Hafsa, the news has reached me that you cause Allah's Messenger trouble. You know that Allah's Messenger does not love you, and had I not been (your father) he would have divorced you." (On hearing this) she wept bitterly.

=== Pen and paper ===
Ali Asgher Razwy, a 20th century Shi'a Islamic scholar writes:

If Umar was right in his attempts to inhibit the freedom of action Muhammad, the Messenger of God, then it means that the latter was "wrong." And if he (Muhammad) was "wrong", then it means that Al-Qur’an al-Majid was also "wrong" because it claimed that:

Nor does he (Muhammad) say (anything) of (his own) desire. It is no less than inspiration sent down to him. (Chapter 53; verses 3 and 4)

If Umar was right, then Muhammad and Qur’an were "wrong." This is the only conclusion to which such a line of argument can lead. It is now for the Muslims to decide if this is the logic which appeals to them, and therefore, is acceptable to them.

=== After Muhammad ===
Shia claim that the despair felt by Umar at the time of Muhammad's death was not genuine, they insist that there was no despair, only threats aimed to delay matters so that his friend and confederate Abu Bakr could return before Ali was confirmed as the successor. As for Ali's allegiance to Abu Bakr's rule, this too was made up to support Abu Bakr's claim to power.

=== Alleged coup d'état ===
Ali Asgher Razwy, a 20th century Shi'a Islamic scholar writes:

When Muhammad Mustafa died in A.D. 632, his successors - Abu Bakr and Umar - lost no time in seizing the estate of Fadak from his daughter. Umar was a conscientious man, and he was presumably prompted by his moral courage to "rectify" the "error" which Muhammad had made in giving the estate of Fadak to his daughter in A.D. 628 Umar had, to all intents and purposes, appointed himself a "censor" of the words and deeds of Muhammad while the latter was still alive. If he countermanded his (Muhammad's) orders after his death vis-à-vis his succession or the estate of Fadak, there is nothing odd about it. If he had any inhibitions in this matter, he threw them overboard as soon as Muhammad died.

=== Abu Bakr's era ===
Shi'a view Umar as the "khalifa-maker" of Abu Bakr and that during Abu Bakr's khilafat, Umar was his principal adviser. Ali is quoted saying:

I watched the plundering of my inheritance till the first one [Abu Bakr] went his way but handed over the Caliphate to Ibn al-Khattab after himself.

(Then he quoted al-A'sha's verse):

My days are now passed on the camel's back (in difficulty) while there were days [of ease] when I enjoyed the company of Jabir's brother Hayyan.

(Implying the contrast between the present and the time of Muhammad)

It is strange that during his [Abu Bakr] lifetime he wished to be released from the caliphate but he confirmed it for the other one [Umar] after his death. No doubt these two shared its udders strictly among themselves".

=== Umar's Caliphate ===
Ali Asgher Razwy, a 20th century Shi'a Twelver Islamic scholar states:

The Banu Umayya were the traditional champions of idolatry and the arch-enemies of Muhammad and his clan, the Banu Hashim. Muhammad had broken their power but Umar revived them. The central component of his policy, as head of the government of Saqifa, was the restoration of the Umayyads. He turned over Syria to them as their "fief", and he made them the first family in the empire.

=== Marriage to Umm Kulthum bint Ali ===
The majority of Shi'a's are in agreement that Umm Kulthum, the daughter of the Ali, was not married to Umar. One narration concerning the marriage is, A hadith attributed to Ja'far al-Sadiq reports:

When `Omer sought the hand of Umm Kultham for marriage, Ali (A.S.) said, `But she is only a child,’ `Omer said to al-`Abbas, ‘I sought the hand of the daughter of your nephew, and he turned me down. By Allah, I shall damage the well of Zamzam, and I shall leave nothing precious belonging to you except that I ruin it, and I shall get two witnesses to testify that he stole, and I shall cut off his right hand.’ Al-`Abbas came and informed Ali (A.S.) (of what `Omer had said), asking him to let him take care of that matter, which he did

Shi'as tend to view this as Sahih and have included it in Furu al-Kafi..

Ali is further quoted in the same sermon:

This one [Umar] put the Caliphate in a tough enclosure where the utterance was haughty and the touch was rough. Mistakes were in plenty and so also the excuses therefore. One in contact with it was like the rider of an unruly camel. If he pulled up its rein the very nostril would be slit, but if he let it loose he would be thrown. Consequently, by Allah people got involved in recklessness, wickedness, unsteadiness and deviation".

=== Death ===
It is recorded in some Shi'a texts that Ali said:

Nevertheless, I remained patient despite length of period and stiffness of trial, till when he [Umar] went his way [of death] he put the matter [of Caliphate] in a group and regarded me to be one of them. But good Heavens! what had I to do with this "consultation"? Where was any doubt about me with regard to the first of them [Abu Bakr] that I was now considered akin to these ones [in the consultation]?"

Ali Asgher Razwy, a 20th century Shi'a Islamic scholar writes:

The seeds of civil war in Islam were planted on the day when Umar picked out the members of his electoral committee. Instead of one candidate for caliphate, he made six candidates. If his decision to appoint his successor had been as direct and forthright as that of Abu Bakr had been, Islam might have been spared the traumatic and horrendous experience of civil wars so early in its career. The Muslims who fought against and killed each other in these civil wars, did not belong to the distant future; they belonged to the generation of the Prophet himself. Civil wars broke out in Islam at a time when its idealism was supposed to be still fresh. But the elective system devised by Umar had built-in confrontation, and it took Islam across a great divide. His policy proved to be counter-productive, and his mode of giving the Muslims a leader through his panel of electors turned out to be one of the greatest misfortunes of the history of Islam.

== Views on the Non-Muslim view ==
Edward Gibbon wrote:

The mischiefs that flow from the contests of ambition are usually confined to the times and countries in which they have been agitated. But the religious discord of the friends and enemies of Ali has been renewed in every age of the Hegira, and is still maintained in the immortal hatred of the Persians and Turks. (171) The former, who are branded with the appellation of Shiites or sectaries, have enriched the Mahometan creed with a new article of faith; and if Mahomet be the apostle, his companion Ali is the vicar, of God. In their private converse, in their public worship, they bitterly execrate the three usurpers who intercepted his indefeasible right to the dignity of Imam and Caliph; and the name of Omar expresses in their tongue the perfect accomplishment of wickedness and impiety.

And he also writes that Ali...

...has never been accused of prompting the assassin of Omar; though Persia indiscreetly celebrates the festival of that holy martyr.

== See also ==
- Sunni view of Umar
- Omar Koshan – Shi'i festival celebrating the death of Umar
- Shia view of Ali ibn Abi Talib
- Rashidun – First four caliphs following the death of Muhammad
