= Mu'aqqibat =

Class of guardian angel

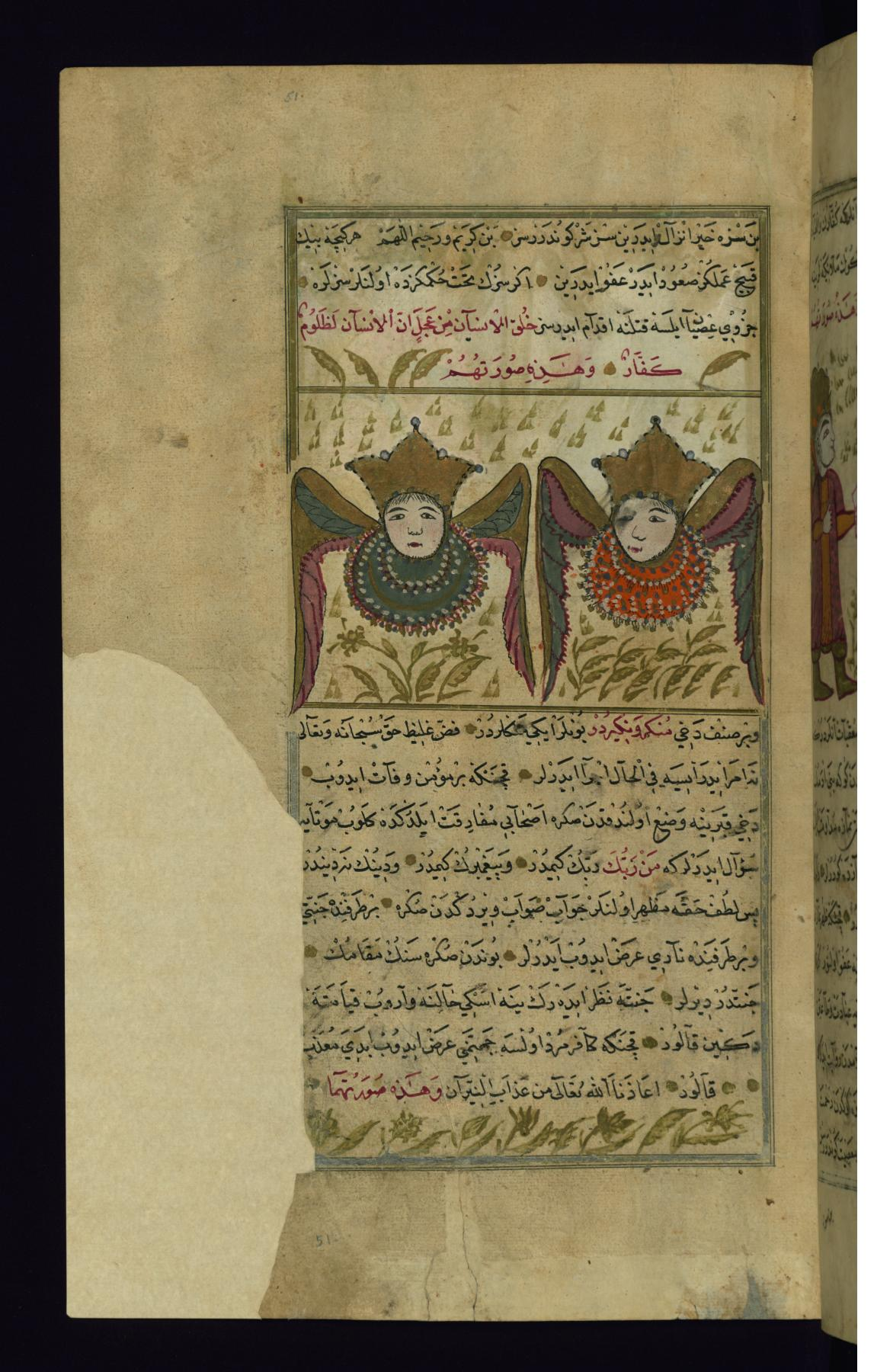
This illustration from Walters manuscript W.659 depicts the angels called Mu'aqqibat, who are charged with bringing blessings from the sun and taking the good deeds of men to heaven.

The Arabic term al-mu'aqqibat (commonly encountered in the definite plural, Arabic معقبات "those who follow one upon another") is a term occurring in the Quran (Q.13:11) which some Islamic commentators consider to refer to a class of guardian angel. Therefore, these Angels are also called al hafathah (الحفظة) which means the guarding angels. They protect human from the harm of evil jinn (جن) and devils (شياطين).

In Islamic tradition, a guardian angel or lit. Watcher angel (raqib "watcher") is an angel which maintains every being in life, sleep, death or resurrection. The Arabic singular for mu'aqqibat would be a mu'aqqib "a person which follows." These angels are included in the hafazhah ("the guards") and the concept of the guardian angel in Islam is similar to the concept of the guardian angel in some Jewish and Christian traditions. Each person is assigned four Hafaza angels, two of which keep watch during the day and two during the night.

Muhammad is reported to have said that every man has ten guardian angels. Ali ben-Ka'b/Ka'b bin 'Ujrah, and Ibn 'Abbas read these as angels.

== Etymology ==
The word al-Mu'aqqibat is the plural of the word al-mua'qqibah. The word is derived from the word 'aqiba meaning heel, from here the word is understood in the sense that it follows the following as his heels at the heels of putting the race. Pattern names used here meaning an emphasis and referred to is the language of the angels who were assigned to follow every creature of God in earnest.

== The mu'aqqibat of the Qur'an ==
The angels assigned to keep a servant in all ihwalnya, stated in the Qur'an Al-Ra'du (Q13.10-11), which reads: "For each (such person) there are (angels) in succession, before and behind him: They guard him by command of God. Verily never will God change the condition of a people until they change it themselves (with their own souls)."

For each one are successive [angels] before and behind him who protect him by the decree of Allah. (Al-Raad: 10-11)

And Surah Al-An'am, as translated by Abdullah Yusuf Ali, reads: "He is irresistibly, supreme over his servants and he sets guardians over you " (Al-An'am(6): Q61)

== See also ==
- List of angels in theology
