= Falih Al-Fayyad =

Iraqi politician, PMC chairman

Falih Al-Fayyad فالح الفياض

Chairman of the Popular Mobilisation Commission
- Incumbent
- Assumed office 26 November 2016
- Prime Minister: See list: Haider al-Abadi; Adil Abdul-Mahdi; Mustafa al-Kadhimi; Mohammed Shia Al Sudani; Ali al-Zaidi
- Preceded by: Office established

Chairman of the Ataa Movement
- Incumbent
- Assumed office 2017
- Preceded by: Position established

National Security Advisor of Iraq
- In office July 2009 – July 2020
- Prime Minister: Nouri al-Maliki; Haider al-Abadi; Adil Abdul-Mahdi; Mustafa al-Kadhimi
- Succeeded by: Qasim al-Araji

Personal details
- Born: Falih Faisal Fahad Al-Fayyad; 27 March 1956 (age 70) Baghdad, Kingdom of Iraq
- Party: Ataa Movement
- Education: University of Mosul

Falih Faisal Fahad Al-Fayyad (Arabic: فالح فيصل فهد الفياض; born 27 March 1956) is an Iraqi politician, former national security advisor, and the current chairman of the Popular Mobilization Forces (PMF). He is also the founder of the Ataa Movement.

== Biography ==
Al-Fayyad was born on 27 March 1956 in Baghdad. He received his bachelor's degree in Electrical Engineering from the University of Mosul in 1977. He is the Chairman of the Popular Mobilization Commission and the Chairman and Founder of the Ataa Movement. Until July 2020, Al-Fayyad was the Iraqi Prime Minister’s National Security Advisor.

On 8 January 2021, the U.S. Treasury Department sanctioned Al-Fayyad for "his connection to serious human rights abuse", and addressed his role in the violent repression of Iraqi protests beginning in October 2019. During the protests, Iranian-backed militias, headed by Al-Fayyad, used marksmen to fire live bullets, hot water and tear gas against anti-government protesters, leading to many deaths and injuries. The sanction was based on the Magnitsky Act and resulted in Al-Fayyad being placed on the Specially Designated Nationals and Blocked Persons List by the Office of Foreign Assets Control's. In May 2025, analysts at The Washington Institute for Near East Policy reported that Asa'ib Ahl al-Haq had escalated a political campaign against Al-Fayyad, accusing him of advancing Turkish interests through the incorporation of the Nineveh Guard Forces and Kirkuk Shield Forces into the Popular Mobilization Forces. The report described the dispute as part of a broader power struggle within Iraq's Shia political and militia networks.

== Positions ==
- Chairman of the Popular Mobilization Commission (2016–)
- National Security Advisor (2009–2020)
- Founder and leader of Ataa movement.
