= Bali bombings =

Bali bombings may refer to:

- 2002 Bali bombings, in the tourist district of Kuta
- 2005 Bali bombings, in Jimbaran Beach Resort and Kuta

== See also ==
- Bali
