= Zamzam (political party) =

Zamzam زمزم
- Leader: Rheil Gharaibeh
- Founded: 2016
- Headquarters: Amman
- Ideology: Islamic democracy
- Political position: Centre-right to right-wing
- Religion: Sunni Islam
- Chamber of Deputies: 5 / 130
- Senate: 0 / 65

Zamzam (Arabic: زمزم), officially the National Congress Party (Arabic: حزب المؤتمر الوطني), is a moderate Islamist political party in Jordan which was established in 2016 by the Zamzam initiative members, who have defected from the Jordanian Muslim Brotherhood. The party won 5 seats in the 2016 general elections.

== See also ==
- List of Islamic political parties
