= Darda'il =

Angels in Islamic tradition

In Islamic tradition, Darda'il (Arabic: دردائيل "Journeyers of God") are angels that travel in the earth searching out assemblies where people remember God's name. An angel named Darda'il is also invoked in exorcism.

An angel named Darda'il is also present in Yazidism.

== See also ==
- List of angels in theology
