= Islamic Labour Movement in Iraq =

Islamic political party in Iraq

The Islamic Labour Movement in Iraq is a political party in Iraq. At the legislative elections, 31 January 2005, the party won 0.5% of the popular vote and 2 out of 275 seats.

== See also ==
- List of Islamic political parties
