= Topics in Sharia law =

This page lists the rulings and applications of the various topics in Sharia law.

== Hygiene and purification ==
In Islam, purification has a spiritual dimension and a physical one. Muslims believe that certain human activities and contact with impure animals and substances cause impurity. Classic Islamic law details how to recognize impurity, and how to remedy it. Muslims use water for purification in most circumstances, although earth can also be used under certain conditions. Before prayer or other religious rituals, Muslims must clean themselves in a prescribed manner. The manner of cleansing, either wudhu or ghusl, depends on the circumstances. Muslims' cleaning of dishes, clothing and homes are all done in accordance with stated laws.

== Economic law ==
All Muslims who live above the subsistence level must pay an annual alms, known as zakat. In the modern sense, this would be Islam's equivalent to US Social Security or UK National Insurance. This is not charity, but rather an obligation owed by the eligible Muslim to the poor of the community. The amount is calculated based on the wealth of the Muslim. There is no fixed rate stated in Quran; but the generally practiced rate is 2.5 percent. Eligibility and total payable varies; depending on the type and quantity of wealth being assessed. If the Government wishes to create a comprehensive and robust welfare state, the rate can be increased. Wealth includes savings, jewelry and land. Classic Islamic law details the tax, how it is assessed, its collection, and its distribution.

Islamic law recognizes private and community property, as well as overlapping forms of entitlement for charitable purposes, known as waqf or trusts. Under Sharia law, however, ownership of all property ultimately rests with God; while individual property rights are upheld, there is a corresponding obligation to share, particularly with those in need. The laws of contract and obligation are also formed around this egalitarian Quranic requirement, prohibiting unequal exchanges or unfair advantage in trade. On this basis, the charging of interest on loans is prohibited, as are other transactions in which risks are borne disproportionately to the potential returns between parties to a transaction. The limits on personal liability afforded by incorporation are seen as a form of usury in this sense, as is insurance. All these inequities in risk and reward between parties to a transaction, known collectively as riba, are prohibited. For this reason, Islamic banking and financing are partnerships between customers and institutions, where risk and reward are distributed equitably. Partnerships, rather than corporations, are the key concept in collective Islamic business. Financing and investments are accomplished in this manner, as purchases and resales, with equity shifting over time between the institution and the client as payments are made or returns are recognized. Conversely, no individual is shielded from the consequences of poor judgement or bad timing. The Islamic financial and investment models have taken root in the West and begun to flourish. Classic Islamic law details the manner of contracting, the types of transactions, the assignment of liability and reward, and the responsibilities of the parties in Islamic trade.

== Dietary law ==
During the Islamic month of Ramadan, Muslims abstain from food and drinks between dawn and sunset. Exceptions to this obligation are made for children who are pre-pubescent, the infirm, travelers, and pregnant or menstruating women. During Ramadan, the daylight hours will often begin and end with a large meal. After dinner, many Muslims participate in special communal prayers held during Ramadan. The end of Ramadan fasting is celebrated with special prayers, gatherings of family and friends, and specially prepared meals. Muslims may also fast on other special days of the year, and to make up for missed days of fasting. Classic Islamic law details the exact definition of the fast, the times of fasting, how a fast may be broken, who must fast, and permitted exceptions to the fast.

== Theological obligation ==
At least once in each Muslim's lifetime, they must attempt a visit to the Holy Places of Islam located in Mecca, Saudi Arabia. The focus of this journey is the Kaaba, a small rectangular building around which a huge mosque has been built. This pilgrimage, known as the Hajj, begins two months after Ramadan each year. Dressed in symbolically simple clothing, Muslim pilgrims circle the Kaaba seven times, often followed by a drink from the Zamzam Well. Next, a symbolic search for water is performed by travelling back and forth between two nearby peaks. On the eighth day of the month, the pilgrims travel to Mina in the desert and spend the night in tents. The following day, over two million Muslims gather on the slopes of Mount Arafat, where the afternoon is spent in prayer. The Feast of Sacrifice, celebrated by Muslims worldwide, is performed by pilgrims in Mina the next day, and includes the slaughter of an animal. Finally, the pilgrims perform a ritual Stoning of the Devil by tossing pebbles at three pillars. Classic Islamic law details the manner in which the pilgrim dresses, behaves, arrives, departs and performs each of these rituals.

== Marital jurisprudence ==
The Qur'an permits a Muslim man to marry more than one woman at a time (up to a maximum of four), but does not encourage such behaviour. Polygamy is only permitted in certain circumstances, such as when the death of another man has left his wife with no other means of support. All wives are entitled to separate living quarters at the behest of the husband and all should receive equal attention, support, treatment and inheritance. It is highly discouraged for men to marry more than one, in modern practice, it is uncommon for a Muslim man to have more than one wife; if he does so, it is often due to the infertility of his first wife. The practice of polygamy has been regulated or abolished in some Muslim states.

See Al-Nisa (about orphan women and women when the ratio of men to women was inequivalent because of the war during Muhammad's time.) 4:3, 4:129 “If ye fear that ye shall not be able to deal justly with the ORPHANS, marry women of your choice, two, or three, or four; but if ye fear that ye shall not be able to deal justly (with them), then only one, or (a captive) that your right hands possess. That will be more suitable, to prevent you from doing injustice” (4:3)

“If a woman fears indifference or neglect from her husband, there is no blame on either of them if they seek [fair] settlement, which is best. But if you are ever inclined to selfishness. But if you are gracious and mindful [of God], surely God is All-Aware of what you do.”(4:128-129)

“Justice to women and orphans is part of religion and the fear of Allah. Stand out firmly for justice to all, even against yourselves or your nearest of kin. Remain firm in faith, and consort not with evil or hypocrisy. Be true in speech, and wound not others, nor distinguish between teachers of truth, for Allah’s truth is one and should be believed” (4:127-152)

== Apostasy ==
In most interpretations of Sharia, conversion by Muslims to other religions or becoming secular, is strictly forbidden and is termed apostasy.

The accusation of apostasy may be used against non-conventional interpretations of the Quran. The severe persecution of the famous expert in Arabic literature, Nasr Abu Zayd, is an example of this. Similar accusations and persecutions were famously leveled against the author Salman Rushdie. The definition of apostasy from Islam, and whether and how it should be punished are matters of controversy – Islamic scholars differ in their opinions on these questions.

== Customs ==
Practitioners of Islam are generally taught to follow some specific customs in their daily lives. Most of these customs can be traced back to Abrahamic traditions in Pre-Islamic Arabian society. Due to Muhammad's sanction or tacit approval of such practices, these customs are considered to be Sunnah (practices of Muhammad as part of the religion) by the Ummah (Muslim nation). It includes customs like:

- Saying "Bismillah" (in the name of God) before eating and drinking.
- Using the right hand for drinking and eating.
- Saying "As-Salaam Alaikum" (peace be upon you) when meeting someone and answering with "Wa 'alaikumus salam" (and peace be upon you).
- Saying "Alhamdulillah" (all gratitude is for only God) when sneezing and responding with "Yarhamukallah" (God have mercy on you).
- In the sphere of hygiene, it includes:
  - Clipping the moustache
  - Cutting nails
  - Circumcising the male offspring
  - Cleaning the nostrils, the mouth, and the teeth and
  - Cleaning the body after urination and defecation
- Abstention from sexual relations during the menstrual cycle and the puerperal discharge,^{[Quran 2:222]} and ceremonial bath after the menstrual cycle, and Janabah (seminal/ovular discharge or sexual intercourse).^{[Quran 4:43]}^{[Quran 5:6]}
- Burial rituals include funeral prayer of bathed and enshrouded body in coffin cloth and burying it in a grave.

== Rituals ==
There are two festivals that are considered Sunnah.

- Eid ul-Fitr
- Eid al-Adha

Rituals associated with these festivals:

- Sadaqah (charity) before Eid ul-Fitr prayer.
- The Prayer and the Sermon on Eid day.
- Takbirs (glorifying God) after every prayer in the days of Tashriq. (Normally these days are considered to be the ones in which pilgrims stay at Mina once they return from Muzdalifah i.e., the 10th, 11th, 12th and 13th of Dhu al-Hijjah.)
- Sacrifice of unflawed, four-legged grazing animal of appropriate age after the prayer of Eid al-Adha in the days of Tashriq.

== Dress code ==
The Quran also places a dress code upon its followers. The rule for men has been ordained before the women: "say to the believing men to lower their gaze and preserve their modesty, it will make for greater purity for them and Allah is well aware of all that they do."^{[Quran 24:30]} The text continues, "And say to the believing women that they cast down their looks and guard their private parts and do not display their ornaments except what appears thereof, and let them wear their khumūr over their bosoms, and not display their ornaments except to their husbands..."^{[24:31]} All those men in whose presence a woman is not obliged to practise the dress code are known as her mahrams. Men have a more relaxed dress code: the body must be covered from knee to waist. However, under Sharia law, women are required to cover all of their bodies except hands and face. Covering the face is the subject of some divergence of opinion amongst the scholars – some consider it to be compulsory since the face is the major source of attraction, whilst others consider it to be highly recommended. The rationale given for these rules is that men and women are not to be viewed as sexual objects. Men are required to keep their guard up and women to protect themselves. In theory, should either one fail, the other prevents the society from falling into fitna (temptation or discord).

== Slavery ==
In Islamic jurisprudence, slavery was an exceptional condition, with the general rule being a presumption of freedom (al-'asl huwa 'l-hurriya — "The basic principle is liberty") for a person if his or her origins were unknown. Lawful enslavement was restricted to two instances: capture in war (on the condition that the prisoner is not a Muslim), or birth in slavery. Islamic law did not recognize the classes of slave from pre-Islamic Arabia including those sold or given into slavery by themselves and others, and those indebted into slavery. A well-known prophetic tradition has severely chastised those who enslave free people for monetary gain. Though a free Muslim could not be enslaved, conversion to Islam by a non-Muslim slave did not require that he or she then should be liberated. Slave status was not affected by conversion to Islam.

== Non-Muslim status ==
Based on Quranic verses and Islamic traditions, classical Sharia distinguishes between Muslims, followers of other Abrahamic monotheistic religions, and pagans or people belonging to other polytheistic religions. As monotheists, Jews and Christians have traditionally been considered "People of The Book," and afforded a special status known as dhimmi derived from a theoretical contract - "dhimma" or "residence in return for taxes". There are parallels for this in Roman and Jewish law. Muslim governments in the Indus basin readily extended the dhimmi status to the Hindus and Buddhists of India. Eventually, the largest school of Islamic scholarship applied this term to all non-Muslims living in Islamic lands outside the sacred area surrounding Mecca, Saudi Arabia.

Classical Sharia incorporated the religious laws and courts of Christians, Jews and Hindus, as seen in the early Caliphate, Al-Andalus, Indian subcontinent, and the Ottoman Millet system. In medieval Islamic societies, the qadi (Islamic judges) usually could not interfere in the matters of non-Muslims unless the parties voluntarily choose to be judged according to Islamic law, thus the dhimmi communities living in Islamic states usually had their own laws independent from the Sharia law, such as the Jews who would have their own Halakha courts. These courts did not cover cases involved other religious groups, or capital offences or threats to public order. By the 18th century, however, dhimmis frequently attended the Ottoman Muslim courts, where cases were taken against them by Muslims, or they took cases against Muslims or other dhimmis. Oaths sworn by dhimmis in these courts were tailored to their beliefs.

== See also ==
- Sharia
