= Islamic education =

Islamic education may refer to:

- Islamic studies, the academic study of Islam and Islamic culture
- Madrasah, the Arabic word for any type of educational institution
- Islamic Education Society, an Islamic organization in India
- Education in Islam
