= Sunni view of Umar =

The Sunni Muslims' view of Umar ibn al-Khattab (584-644 AD) portray him as the second most esteemed companion of Muhammad. He is recognized as the second caliph of the Rashidun Caliphate and a central figure in the early expansion and strengthening of the Islamic state. His conversion to Islam is considered a turning point for the early Muslim community, significantly bolstering its morale and public presence in Mecca. Described as a potential prophet, Umar is also revered for receiving divine praise and for his protective role against fitnah, with numerous Sunni traditions underscoring the severe consequences for those who revile him.

== Conversion to Islam ==
Umar’s conversion to Islam was a transformative event for the early Muslim community in Mecca, as documented in numerous Sunni narrations. According to these narrations, Umar embraced Islam after approximately forty men and eleven women had already accepted the faith. Unlike many early converts who kept their faith private due to fear of persecution, Umar proclaimed his Islam openly, bringing strength and morale to the Muslims.

The significance of his conversion is further emphasized in various prophetic traditions preserved in collections such as those of al-Tirmidhi, Al-Tabarani, and Al-Hakim al-Nishapuri. Ibn Umar narrates that Muhammad prayed, asking Allah to strengthen the Islam through the conversion of whichever of the two men — Umar or Amr ibn Hisham — was more beloved to Him. Another narration from Ibn Abbas reports that Muhammad specifically named Umar in this prayer.

Several early Islamic sources describe both the spiritual and societal impact of Umar's conversion. According to Ibn Abbas, the angel Jibrīl (Gabriel) descended and informed Muhammad that the heavens rejoiced at Umar’s acceptance of Islam. Furthermore, the Quraysh Mushrikites (polytheists) are reported to have said, “Today the Muslims have become equal to us,” upon his conversion. This moment is traditionally associated with the revelation of Quran 8:64: “O Prophet, Allah is sufficient for you and for the believers who follow you.”

In a mursal report recorded by Ibn Sa'd, Ayyūb ibn Mūsā quoted Muhammad as saying:

Indeed, Allah has placed the truth upon Umar’s tongue and heart, and he is al-Fārūq, the one who distinguishes between truth and falsehood.

Ali ibn Abi Talib, in a narration preserved by Ibn Asakir and others, described Umar’s public defiance of the Quraysh when undertaking the Hijrah (emigration) to Medina. According to the report:

I did not know of anyone among the emigrants who migrated openly except Umar ibn al-Khaṭṭāb. When he resolved to migrate, he girded himself with his sword, slung his bow across his shoulder, took arrows from his quiver and held them in his hand, grasped his spear (anaza), and set off toward the Kaaba while the leaders of Quraysh were gathered in its courtyard. He circumambulated the Kaaba seven times, then came to the Maqam Ibrahim and prayed two Rak'a. Then he went to each group (of Quraysh) one by one and said to them: "May your faces be disfigured! May Allah disgrace only these nostrils! Whoever wants his mother to lose him, or his children to become orphans, or his wife to become a widow — let him meet me behind this valley!" But no one followed him except some of the oppressed, whom he instructed and guided. Then he went on his way. Some of his family and his people accompanied him during his migration, as well as some of the weak who sought protection through him.

Abd Allah ibn Mas'ud, a prominent early Muslim, is reported to have said, as narrated by al-Bukhari: "We remained honored ever since Umar embraced Islam." In another narration recorded by Ibn Sa'd, he further remarked:

The Islam of Umar was a conquest, his migration was a victory, and his leadership was a mercy. I remember when we could not pray in the Kaaba until Umar embraced Islam. When he did, he fought them until they left us, and we prayed."

Hudhayfah ibn al-Yaman, another companion of Muhammad, offered a retrospective reflection:

When Umar embraced Islam, Islam was like a man advancing, growing only closer; but when he was killed, Islam became like a man retreating, growing only more distant.

al-Nawawi records that Umar participated in all of Muhammad’s battles and was among those who remained steadfast with him during the Battle of Uhud and Battle of Hunayn.

== Status in Islam ==
=== Narrations Attributed to Muhammad ===
Muhammad praised Umar in numerous narrations, highlighting his deep faith, wisdom, and spiritual stature. He described a dream in which he drank milk that flowed through his fingernails and passed it to Umar, interpreting it as knowledge. In another dream, he saw Umar wearing a long garment trailing on the ground, which interpreted as a sign of Umar's strong adherence to Islam. Muhammad stated that Shaytan avoids the path of Umar and identified him as one of the Muhaddathun—those who receive divine inspiration despite not being prophets. He declared that if there were to be a prophet after him, it would have been Umar, and affirmed that Allah has placed the truth upon Umar’s tongue and heart. He also described Umar as a “lantern of the people of Jannah (Paradise)”, and said, “Whoever hates Umar hates me.” (Note: In other narrations, Muhammad said “Whoever loves Umar has loved me, and whoever hates Umar has hated me.”) He reported that Allah specifically praise Umar on the night of Arafah, and that the angel Jibrīl told him, “Umar's satisfaction is justice, and his anger is torment.” He also stated that as long as Umar lives, a barrier will exist between the Ummah and fitnah (tribulation). Furthermore, he directed his followers to adhere to the guidance of Abu Bakr and Umar after his death, and affirmed that obedience to them ensures righteous guidance.

=== Narrations Attributed to the Sahabah ===
Umar’s esteemed status among the Sahabah and early Muslims is reflected in numerous testimonies highlighting his character, wisdom, and legacy. Abu Bakr stated that Umar was the most beloved to him after Muhammad and affirmed on his deathbed that appointing Umar as caliph was the best choice. Ali ibn Abi Talib emphasized the Sahabah's trust in Umar’s judgment, reportedly calling him “the voice of wisdom", and expressed that he would prefer to meet Allah with Umar’s record of good deeds over anyone else’s. Ibn Umar noted that Quranic revelations often coincided with Umar’s opinions and praised his unmatched generosity after Muhammad's death. Other Sahabah echoed this reverence: Hudhayfah ibn al-Yaman said knowledge was as if placed in Umar's lap and that only he could hold critics accountable; A'ishah described him as a uniquely good leader; and Mu'awiyah observed that the world favored Umar over Abu Bakr, highlighting how deeply the early Muslims relied on him; Ibn Mas'ud asserted that Umar's knowledge would outweigh that of all creation if measured. He added that Umar surpassed others in four key contributions: advocating for the execution of Badr captives, a stance later affirmed by Qur'anic revelation in Surah al-Anfal verse 68; suggesting Muhammad's wives wear hijab, supported by Surah al-Ahzab verse 53; prompting Muhammad supplication to strengthen Islam with him; and being the first to pledge allegiance to Abu Bakr as Khalifah. Khalid ibn al-Walid praised Umar as a great supporter of Islam, stating that no fitnah would arise as long as he was alive.

== Condemnation of Reviling Umar ==
Sunni Islamic tradition preserves numerous narrations that condemn reviling Umar and the companions of Muhammad. These include direct warnings attributed to Muhammad, as well as reports attributed to Ali ibn Abi Talib and his descendants that express support and recognition for Abu Bakr and Umar. Such narrations emphasize the elevated status of the companions and describe divine consequences for those who curse or slander them.

=== Muhammad’s Warnings Against Reviling His Companions ===
Muhammad strongly warned his followers against criticizing or reviling his companions. He stated:

Do not revile my Ṣaḥābah, because I take an oath in the name of that Being (Allah) who controls my life, if any of you have to spend even gold equal to Mount Uhud, it will never equal one mudd spent by the Ṣaḥābah, and not even half a mudd!

=== Statements Attributed to Ali ibn Abi Talib and His Descendants Regarding Abu Bakr and Umar ===
Ali ibn Abi Talib explicitly affirmed the excellence of Abu Bakr and Umar in multiple narrations. He is reported to have said that the most virtuous individuals after Muhammad were “Abu Bakr, then Umar.” In another narration, he referred to them as the best of the Ummah after Muhammad. During his caliphate, Ali warned against a group that would arise near the end of time which are those who would falsely claim allegiance to his family while cursing Abu Bakr and Umar. He labeled them “al-Rafidah” and instructed Muslims to oppose them wherever they were found. He also publicly defended Abu Bakr and Umar in a sermon delivered at the mosque, in response to hearing slander against them. Ali stated:

What is wrong with those who make allegations about the two masters of Quraysh, the two fathers of the Muslims, allegations which I would never say or ever want to hear others say; and for which I may be punished? By He (Allah) who split the seed and created the soul, only a pious believer loves them, and only a wretched sinner hates them. Those two accompanied Allah’s Messenger, commanding all that was good and prohibiting all that was evil; who became angry with wrongdoers and punished them based on truth and honesty alone. In their rulings, they did not overstep the opinions of Allah’s Messenger. In fact, their opinions always coincided with those of Allah’s Messenger and the believer were pleased with both of them throughout their respective caliphates... After Abū Bakr, Umar took command, and I was among those pleased with his appointment. He (Umar) ruled according to the code of Allah’s Messenger and his Companion, Abū Bakr, following their footsteps the way the young camel follows its mother. I swear by Allāh, he was kind and gentle with the weak, a champion of the cause of the oppressed and without any blame concerning Allāh’s religion (Islam). Allāh manifested examples of the truth through him and made the truth a part of him to such a degree that we used to think that an angel was speaking with his tongue. Allāh made his conversion a strengthening factor for Islām, and placed in the hearts of the hypocrites a fear of him, and in the hearts of the believers love for him. Allah’s Messenger compared him to Angel Jibril in his harshness towards the enemies of Islām. So who among you can be compared to the two of them?! May Allāh’s Mercy be upon them, and may Allāh provide us with the ability to continue in their paths. Let whoever loves me, love them; whoever does not love them has angered me, and I will have no right to do with him. If I hear anymore derogatory talk about the two of them, I will punish the offenders severely. After today, whoever is brought before me will get the punishment of a slanderer. Verily the best of this nation after its Prophet were Abū Bakr and Umar. Then Allāh knows who is the best, I am saying this asking Allāh’s forgiveness for both you and myself.

Muhammad al-Baqir, the great-grandson of Ali ibn Abi Talib and regarded by Shia Muslims as the fifth Imam, expressed unequivocal disapproval of those who spoke ill of Abu Bakr and Umar. According to narrations transmitted by Jabir ibn Yazid al-Ju'fi, al-Baqir was deeply disturbed by reports of individuals in Iraq who falsely claimed he had instructed them to curse Abu Bakr and Umar. He responded:

O Jābir! The news has reached me that there are certain people in Iraq who claim to love us (the Ahl al-Bayt) but they speak ill of Abū Bakr and Umar. They also falsely claim that I am the one who ordered them to do so. Tell them that I have nothing to do with them before of Allah. I take an oath by the Being who controls the life of mine, if I were to be put in charge of Iraq, I would execute them and at the same time earn great reward by doing so. May I be deprived of the intercession of Allah's Messenger if I do not seek forgiveness on their (Abū Bakr and Umar) behalf and if do not I invoke Allah to shower His mercy upon them. Indeed the enemies of Allah are negligent with regards to them.

Al-Baqir further declared that anyone who fails to recognize the virtues of Abu Bakr and Umar is among the most ignorant of Muhammad’s teachings. He also firmly denied claims that Abu Bakr and Umar oppressed the Ahl al-Bayt or deprived them of their rights, swearing by Allah that no such injustice occurred. He encouraged companionship with Abu Bakr and Umar, taking personal responsibility for any perceived sin in doing so, and affirmed that both Allah and His Messenger are free from what he described as false accusations attributed to the Ahl al-Bayt.

Hasan ibn Hasan, the grandson of Ali ibn Abi Talib, strongly condemned the al-Rafidah—those who expressed hatred toward Abu Bakr and Umar. He warned that, were he given authority over them, he would impose severe punishment without offering any opportunity for repentance. He further remarked, "Al-Rafidah have rebelled against us just as the Khawarij rebelled against grandfather (Ali ibn Abi Talib)." Zayd ibn Ali, the great-grandson of Ali and brother of Muhammad al-Baqir, reportedly stated that distancing oneself from Abu Bakr and Umar is akin to distancing oneself from Ali ibn Abi Talib himself. Abd Allah ibn al-Hasan, another great-grandson of Ali, expressed strong support for Abu Bakr and Umar, praying for Allah’s mercy upon them while withholding it from those who refrain from doing so.
