= Turkish model =

Combination of secularism and Islamism

The Turkish model refers to the focus on Republic of Turkey as "an example of a modern, moderate Muslim state that works." Turkey has been seen as combining a secular state and constitution, with a government run by a political party or political parties (Justice and Development Party, AKP) with "roots in political Islam". The AKP, led by Recep Tayyip Erdoğan, has ruled Turkey with a large majority in parliament since 2002. During this time Turkey has had good relations with the West, but also cordial ties with the Islamic Republic of Iran and a more pro-Palestinian policy. It has had vigorously contested, "substantially free and fair" elections, a vibrant culture, and has undergone an economic boom, developing a "large and growing middle class." However, as of summer 2013 and the crushing of the Taksim Gezi Park protests, some commentators complained that the model has come "unstuck".

== Overview ==
The term originated in connection with the Arab Spring and the Arab states—Tunisia, Egypt, and Libya—that had overthrown dictators in 2011 and begun building new political and economic systems. Turkey's "deeply religious" Sunni Muslim prime minister, Erdoğan, was received by "adoring crowds" during a visit to Egypt in September 2011, and Turkey has polled high favorable ratings with many Arab countries. Praise has come from former acting Egyptian president Mohamed Hussein Tantawia, who told reporters after his meeting with Turkey's president Abdullah Gül, "The Turkish experience is the closest experience to the Egyptian people. Turkey is the model to inspire from."

One observer (Sinan Ülgen) has identified "five chief characteristics" of the model: accommodation of Secularism, Democracy, and Political Islam; a stabilizing role by the military; successful economic liberalization and trade integration; membership in Western multilateral organizations like NATO, the Council of Europe, and the European Court for Human Rights; and popular confidence in the country’s institutions.

Some critics have complained about the treatment of minority Alevi and Kurdish groups, and of some imprisoned journalists. As of March 2013, a "mounting number of Turkish lawyers, politicians, journalists" have been imprisoned, in what journalist Dexter Filkins has called "an increasingly harsh campaign to crush domestic opposition". Among those imprisoned have been Ragip Zarakolu, a constitutional law professor; Ahmet Şık, a prize-winning investigative journalist; and Nedim Şener, a noted free-speech activist.

=== Alleged uniqueness ===
Others have noted that Turkey's unique history may mean the model will be of limited use to Egypt or other countries. According to Şebnem Gümüşçü, the success is based on Islamists accepting the "secular-democratic framework of the Turkish state", and not Islamists' "development of institutional and political structures that accommodated both Islamic and democratic principles"; in other words, the current stability and democracy is only a result of Islamists toeing a line set by secular-democratic frameworks rather than of the Islamists' own doing. The Economist magazine also finds "many reasons to be cautious about expecting Arabs to follow Turks", such as the long evolution of the democratic Islamism, the relative power and prestige of the secularism, and tolerance for electoral politics of military rulers. Journalist Alp Altınörs complains that during the Erdoğan era of 2002–2012, growth has "been coupled with little social benefit". The main force for economic growth has been foreign capital, but "imperialists" have "effectively plundered the country", transferring the equivalent of $120 billion to foreign countries. He also contends that unemployment has remained high, labour rights deteriorated, and inequality worsened, and "harsh repression" of journalists, unions, and Kurds have kept "10,000 political prisoners" in Turkish prisons.

Cihan Tuğal disagrees with the orthodox claim that Turkey represents a model for other Islamic countries with its unique form of Islamic liberalism and refutes any suggestion that what went wrong in Turkey is limited to the AKP’s or more directly to Erdoğan’s arrogance and authoritarian inclinations. On the other hand, his approach is criticised for misreading the Gezi Park protests.

=== Possible deterioration ===
In May–June 2013, there were massive public protests, including a large number of students, against the Erdoğan government. Although Erdoğan described the protesters as "just a few looters", 3.5 million of Turkey's 80 million people are estimated to have taken part in almost 5,000 demonstrations. Five people were killed and more than 8,000 injured by water cannons and tear gas. The event has been described (by journalist Christopher de Bellaigue) as part of a move by Erdoğan away from a more tolerant, diverse, and democratic Turkey, toward "vindictive authoritarianism" that is "undermining his own reputation as a path-finding democrat in the Muslim world".

In May 2016, author Mustafa Akyol lamented that "the rhetoric of liberal opening" in Turkey "has given way to authoritarianism, the peace process with the Kurdish nationalists has fallen apart, press freedoms are diminishing and terrorist attacks are on the rise." Supporters of Erdoğan credit the change to conspiracies in the West aided by "their treacherous 'agents'" in Turkey to undermine the newly powerful and independent Turkey, while Akyol blames it on the corruption of power—AKP members having been "tempted, intoxicated and corrupted" by the "wealth, prestige and glory" of being in power.

== See also ==
- Economy of Turkey
- Politics of Turkey
- History of the Republic of Turkey#AKP government
