= Timeline of the history of Islam (18th century) =

Timeline of the history of Islam: 6th | 7th | 8th | 9th | 10th | 11th | 12th | 13th | 14th | 15th | 16th | 17th | 18th | 19th | 20th | 21st century

== 18th century (1701–1800) (1112 AH – 1215 AH) ==
- 1703: In Ottoman Empire Ahmed III becomes the Sultan. Birth of Shah Wali Ullah. Birth of the religious reformer Muhammad ibn Abd al Wahhab.
- 1707: Death of the Mughal emperor Aurangzeb, accession of his son Bahadur Shah.
- 1711: War between Ottoman Empire and Russia (Russo-Turkish War (1710–11)). Russia defeated at the Battle of Pruth and Treaty of the Pruth signed.
- 1712: Death of the Mughal emperor Bahadur Shah I, accession of Jahandar Shah.
- 1713: Jahandar Shah overthrown by his nephew Farrukhsiyar.
- 1715: In Ottoman Empire the peninsula of Morea and other Adriatic fortresses that had been ceded to Venetian Republic are reconquered.
- 1716: Defeat of Ottoman Empire armies by the Austrians under Prince Eugene of Savoy at Battle of Peterwardein and loss of strategic fortress of Temesvar.
- 1718: In the war against Austria, Ottoman Empire suffers continuing defeat and loss of fortress of Belgrade. By the Treaty of Passarowitz, Ottomans lost Hungary.
- 1719: Deposition of the Mughal emperor Farrukhsiyar. Muhammad Shah ascends the throne. In Sind, the Kalhoras came to power under Nur Muhammad Kalhora. In Ottoman Empire start of a long-period of peace, enlightenment and prosperity that was later named the Tulip period.
- 1722: Saadat Khan found the independent state of Oudh. Battle of Gulnabad between the Afghans and the Persians. The Persians were defeated and the Afghans under Shah Mahmud became the masters of a greater part of Persia. Shah Hussain taken captive, accession of Shah Tahmasp II.
- 1730: Zanzibar freed from Portuguese rule and occupied by Oreart. In Ottoman Empire Sultan Ahmed III is deposed by Patrona Insurrection which ends the Tulip period. Mahmud I ascends the throne.
- 1735: Start of war between Ottoman Empire and Russia (Russo-Turkish War (1735–39)).
- 1737: Entry of Austria into (Russo-Turkish War (1735–39)) against Ottoman Empire.
- 1739: Persian ruler Nader Shah sacks the Mughal capital of Delhi in India. In Ottoman Empire Austria signs the separate Belgrade Treaty and Russia signs the Treaty of Nissa to end Russo-Turkish War (1735–39)
- 1744: Muhammad bin Saud, founder of the al-Saud dynasty, joined forces with the religious leader Muhammad ibn Abd al-Wahhab, founder of the Wahhabi movement in Nejd.
- 1747: Ahmed Shah Abdali established Afghan rule in Afghanistan.
- 1751: Karim Khan Zand establishes the Zand dynasty of Iran
- 1752: Death of Shah Abdul Latif Bhitai, writer of Sassi Pannu, Sohni Mahinwal and Umer Marvo. Ahmed Shah Durrani captured Punjab, Kashmir and Sind.
- 1754: In Ottoman Empire death of Mahmud I and accession of Osman III.
- 1755: Division of the Mataram Sultanate, Indonesia, the last major independent Muslim state in Java before Dutch colonisation.
- 1757: In Ottoman Empire death of Osman III and accession of Mustafa III.
- 1761: Death of Shah Waliullah Dehlavi. Battle of Panipat. Ahmed Shah Abdali came to India at the invitation of Shah Waliullah Dehlavi and smashed rising Maratha Empire power in the Third Battle of Panipat.
- 1764: Conversion to Islam of Areadi Gaya, ruler of Futa Bandu State in West Sudan.
- 1768: Start of the war between Ottoman Empire-Russia (Russo-Turkish War (1768–74) ) and defeats of Ottoman land armies at various battles.
- 1770: Burning of the Ottoman fleet at Naval Battle of Chesma by a Russian fleet that has come from Baltic Sea.
- 1771: Conquest of the Crimean Peninsula by Russian forces and the end of Ottoman dominance over Khanate of Crimea.
- 1773: Death of Ahmed Shah Abdali.
- 1774: In Ottoman Empire death of Mustafa III and accession of Abdul Hamid I. Defeat of the Ottoman armies by Russians. Signing of the Treaty of Kuçuk Kainarji to end the Ottoman-Russian war (Russo-Turkish War (1768–74)). Khanate of Crimea nominally gained independence but in fact became a dependency of Russia.
- 1779: Signing of Aynalikavak Accord between Ottoman Empire and Russia.
- 1783: End of Kalhora rule in Sind. Russia occupies and annexes the Crimean Peninsula and ends the rule of Khanate of Crimea.
- 1787: In Ottoman Empire start of war against Austria and Russia (Russo-Turkish War (1787–92)). Death of Sultan Abdulhamid I and accession of Selim III.
- 1789: Agha Mohammad Khan Qajar establishes the Qajar dynasty of Iran.
- 1791: Signing of the Treaty of Sistova that ends the war between Austria and Ottoman Empire.
- 1792: War between Ottoman Empire and Russia (Russo-Turkish War (1787–92)) ends with signing of the Treaty of Jassy.
- 1793: Selim III issues a set of new regulations for the Ottoman Empire, providing for establishment of a military corps based on European models, reforming economic regulations by curbing the abuses of foreign berats, and revising the tax system.
- 1797: Death of Agha Mohammad Khan Qajar, accession of Fath-Ali Shah Qajar. Russia occupied Dagestan.
- 1798: Landing of the armies of French Republic under the command of Napoleon Bonaparte in Ottoman Province of Egypt. Defeat of the Ottoman provincial army of Mamluks at Battle of the Pyramids. Defeat and burning of French Fleet at naval Battle of Aboukir by the British fleet under Admiral Lord Nelson. Alliance of Ottoman Empire – Great Britain – Russia against France.
- 1799: Defeat of the French expeditionary force from Egypt under Napoleon Bonaparte at Siege of Acre by the Ottoman defenders and retreat of the French back to Egypt. Ranjit Singh declared himself Maharajah of Punjab defeating Afghans. Khoqand declared independent Islamic State. Death of Tipu Sultan, the ruler of Kingdom of Mysore in India. By the end of this century, global Muslim population was estimated at 115 million.

== See also ==
Timeline of Muslim history
