= Timeline of the history of Islam (20th century) =

Timeline of the history of Islam: 6th | 7th | 8th | 9th | 10th | 11th | 12th | 13th | 14th | 15th | 16th | 17th | 18th | 19th | 20th | 21st century

== 20th century (1901–2000) (1318 AH – 1421 AH) ==
- 1901: Abd al-Aziz Ibn Saud captures Riyadh.
- 1902: Birth of Ruhollah Khomeini, the leader of the 1979 Iranian Revolution and the founder of Islamic Republic of Iran.
- 1903: Birth of Syed Abul Ala Maududi (Founder of Jamaat-e-Islami).
- 1905: The beginning of the Salafiyyah movement in Paris with its main sphere of influence in Egypt.
- 1906: Hassan al-Banna, founder of the Muslim Brotherhood born in Egypt.
- 1906: All-India Muslim League was established in Dacca, Bengal. It would later lead the Pakistan Movement.
- 1906: Uprising of merchants and clergy leads Shah Mozaffar ad-Din Shah Qajar to relent to demands for reform, which lead to the Constitution of 1906, providing for a limited male franchise and a National Consultative Assembly which convened that year.
- 1907: The beginning of the Young Turks movement in Turkey.
- 1908: Constitutional monarchy (2.phase) in Ottoman Empire (Turkey)
- 1909: Armenian Christians suffer a genocide in Adana Vilayet, Turkey at the hands of the Young Turk government under the Ottoman Empire. 15,000–30,000 were killed.
- 1911: War of Tripolli between Ottoman Empire and Italy. Treaty of Ouchy (1912).
- 1912: Sarekat Islam cooperative founded in Indonesia, part of the Muhammadiyah reform movement.
- 1912: Balkan wars. The coalition of four Balkan countries defeat Ottoman Empire (Turkey).
- 1912: Treaty of Fez makes Morocco a French and Spanish protectorate, triggering the Fez riots.
- 1913: Mohammad Ali Jinnah joined All India Muslim League.
- 1913: Putsch by the Committee of Union and Progress ("CUP") faction of the Young Turks, known as the Raid on the Sublime Porte, results in resignation of Grand Vizier. In control of the government, CUP withdraws from the London Peace Conference and moves the empire close to Germany in the approach to war.
- 1913: Bulgarians were massacred by the Young Turk government under the Ottoman Empire. 50,000–60,000 Thracian Bulgarians were murdered, which was around 20% of the Bulgarian population in Thrace at that time. Most of the villages with a Bulgarian population were destroyed and the survivors expelled from their places of origin.
- 1914: Under Ottoman rule, secret Arab nationalist societies are formed. World War I begins. The Ottoman Empire enters the war allied with Germany.
- 1914–1918: Ottoman Empire carries out genocides of several communities, such as Assyrian Christians. 200,000 to 275,000 were killed. About half of the Assyrian population in the Ottoman Empire perished.
- 1914: Egypt becomes a British protectorate.
- 1915: Ottoman Empire defeats Allies in Çanakkale (Dardanalles).
- 1916: By the Sykes–Picot Agreement Britain and France plan post-war division of their post-war spheres of influence following the dissolution of the Ottoman Empire.
- 1916: Arab Revolt against Ottoman rule in Hijaz, Palestine and Syria. Lawrence of Arabia leads attacks on the Hejaz Railway.
- 1916: Muslims and Hindus join together in Lucknow Pact seeking more self-rule in India and other reforms from the British government.
- 1917: Britain issues the Balfour Declaration pledging British support for the creation of a Jewish national homeland.
- 1918: Birth of Gamal Abdel Nasser.
- 1918: Tripolitanian Republic declares independence from Italian Libya and becomes the first republican government in the Arab world.
- 1918: After losing virtually their entire empire, the Ottomans capitulate on October 19 and sign the Armistice of Mudros with the Allies on October 30. World War I ends on November 11. Syria becomes a French protectorate.
- 1919-1923: Turkish War of Independence.
- 1919: The first revolution in Egypt led by Saad Zaghlul against British occupation.
- 1919: After the Third Anglo-Afghan War ended with the signing of the Treaty of Rawalpindi, King Amanullah Khan declared Afghanistan a sovereign and fully independent state.
- 1920: Ottoman Sultan Mehmed VI signs the Treaty of Sèvres, reducing the Empire to a fraction of its previous size and allowing for the indefinite presence of Allied forces in Turkey. The treaty is rejected by nationalist leaders, who vow to block its implementation.
- 1920: Emirate of Bukhara and Khanate of Khiva conquered by Bolshevik Russia.
- 1920: Armenia first defeated by the Turkish nationalists then the Soviets.
- 1920: Short-lived Hashemite Kingdom of Syria establish, which surrendered to French forces after the Battle of Maysalun.
- 1921: Abdullah I of Jordan is made King of Transjordan. His father was the Sharif of Mecca. Faisal I of Iraq is made King of Iraq. His father was the Sharif of Mecca.
- 1921: Abd al-Karim leads a revolt against colonial rule in Moroccan Rif, and declares the "Republic of the Rif".
- 1921: Death of Alahazrat Molana Ahmad Raza Khan Barelvi.
- 1921: Treaty of Kars between Soviet Russia and Turkey.
- 1921: Reza Khan Pahlavi stages largely bloodless coup in Persia.
- 1922: Armistice of Mudanya. Turkish nationalists under the leadership of Mustafa Kemal seize control of Turkey and abolish the Ottoman Sultanate, prompting Sultan Mehmed VI to flee Turkey; the 600‑year‑old Ottoman Empire officially ceases to exist.
- 1922: Egypt unilaterally granted independence by the United Kingdom.
- 1923: Mustafa Kemal secures Allied recognition of Turkey's independence in the Treaty of Lausanne and subsequently declares the Republic of Turkey. Ankara officially replaces Constantinople as Turkish capital.
- 1923: Albanian Mussulmans' Congress breaks with caliphate and reforms Islam in Albania by suppressing polygamy and the compulsory veiling of women.
- 1924: The Turkish Grand National Assembly abolishes the Ottoman Caliphate and sends the remaining members of the Ottoman House into exile in a move that begins the extensive de-Islamization of the public sphere in Turkey. Hussain bin Ali declared himself Caliph and established the Sharifian Caliphate.
- 1924: King Abd al-Aziz Ibn Saud conquers Mecca and Medina, leading to the unification of the Kingdoms of Najd and Hejaz.
- 1925: Reza Khan seizes the government in Iran and establishes the Pahlavi dynasty.
- 1925: The Great Syrian Revolt breaks out across the various statelets of Syrian and Lebanon against French rule, which ultimately was put down by force in 1927.
- 1926: Abd al-Aziz Ibn Saud assumes title of King of Najd and Hejaz.
- 1926: Lebanon proclaimed a parliamentary republic under French protectorate.
- 1927: Death of Zaghlul, an Egyptian nationalist leader.
- 1928: Turkey is declared a secular state.
- 1928: Hasan al-Banna founds the Muslim Brotherhood, a Pan-Islamic movement dedicated to social, political, and moral reform in Egypt. The movement would later spread to other Arab nations and to Pakistan.
- 1929: Militant conflicts between Palestinians parties and Jewish settlers in Jerusalem over access to the Wailing Wall.
- 1931: A General Islam Conference held in Jerusalem over the Zionism question with delegates from North Africa, Egypt, the Arabian Peninsula and Mesopotamia issues first Pan Arabic resolution.
- 1932: Iraq granted independence by League of Nations.
- 1932–41: Ma Bufang and his Chinese Muslim soldiers massacre Tibetans in Qinghai Province. The motive was ethnic cleansing of Tibetans and destruction of their culture, resulting in thousands of casualties.
- 1934: War between King Abd al-Aziz Ibn Saud and Imam Yahya of the Yemen. Peace treaty of Taif. Asir becomes part of Saudi Arabia.
- 1935: Iran ("Land of the Aryans") becomes the official name of Persia.
- 1936: Increased Jewish immigration leads to the Arab revolt in Palestine. The demonstrations turned violent in 1937 and met with violent repression from the British Army.
- 1937: Birth of Sami-ul-Haq. He was known as the Father of Taliban.
- 1938: Mustafa Kemal Atatürk died. İsmet İnönü second president of Turkey.
- 1939: Parliament of ex France protectorate Republic of Hatay decides to join Turkey
- 1939: Start of World War II.
- 1940 Lahore Resolution is passed by the All-India Muslim League at Lahore, Punjab — formally resolving to favor an independent Muslim state in South Asia and beginning the Pakistan Movement.
- 1941: Anglo-Soviet invasion of Iran. Reza Shah is forced to abdicate in favor of his son Mohammad Reza Shah.
- 1941: Sayyid Abul Ala Maududi founds Jamaat-e-Islami, the Muslim Brotherhood's South Asian counterpart.
- 1942: Birth of M. Fetullah Gulen, the founder of Hizmet Movement of Turkey.
- 1945: End of World War II. Indonesia declares independence from the Netherlands. New leader Sukarno decides not to implement sharia law nationwide.
- 1945: League of Arab States formed at meeting in Cairo.
- 1946: Jordan, Lebanon, and Syria are granted independence from Britain and France.
- 1947: British India gains independence from Britain, and results in the establishment of the dominions of India and Pakistan. Pakistan is created from the region's Muslim-majority areas under the leadership of Muhammad Ali Jinnah. Disputes over the status of Kashmir leads to the first Indo-Pakistani War; Kashmir is divided between India and Pakistan.
- 1948: Arab countries attack the new state of Israel and suffer defeat in war with Israel. Hundreds of thousands of Palestinians are displaced, Quaid-e-Azam Muhammad Ali Jinnah dies in Karachi.
- 1949: Hasan al-Banna, leader of the Muslim Brotherhood, is assassinated by Egyptian security forces.
- 1949: Second East Turkestan Republic overthrown and re-incorporated into Xinjiang.
- 1951: Libya becomes independent.
- 1952: King Faruq of Egypt forced to abdicate by the free officers led by Gamal Abdel Nasser.
- 1953: Backed by American and British intelligence agencies, General Zahedi leads a coup against Mohammed Mossadegh, returning the Shah to power. Death of King Abd al-Aziz Ibn Saud of Saudi Arabia. The foundation stone is laid to enlarge the Prophet's mosque in Medina. Hizb ut-Tahrir founded
- 1954: Algerian War of Independence begins. Gamal Abdel Nasser bans the Muslim Brotherhood
- 1956: Morocco becomes independent. Tunisia becomes independent. Tripartite Aggression in Egypt caused by nationalization of the Suez Canal. Pakistan becomes a republic.
- 1957: The Bey of Tunisia is deposed, and Bourguiba becomes president. Enlargement of the Haram in Mecca begins. The Federation of Malaya, later renamed Malaysia, gains independence from Britain.
- 1958: October 7, President Iskander Mirza declares Martial Law. General Ayub Khan assumes the powers as Chief Martial Law Administrator.
- 1958: "Free Officers" of the army overthrow Hashemite monarchy of Iraq in 14 July Revolution.
- 1960 Birth of Mullah Muhammad Omar also known as Mullah Omar, an Afghan militant leader and cleric who founded the Taliban.
- 1960: Mali and Senegal become independent. Great Turk scholar Bedi-az-Zaman said Nursi had died in Urfa (Turkey).
- 1960: Military coup in Turkey purges executive, military, judiciary branches and university.
- 1961 Kuwait becomes independent as British mandate. Kuwait becomes the first Gulf country with a written constitution and parliament.
- 1962: Algeria becomes independent.
- 1962: Death of Zaydi Imam of Yemen (Ahmad). Crown Prince Bahr succeeds him and takes the title Imam Mansur Bi-Llah Muhammad.
- 1962: Muslim World League is founded in Mecca.
- 1962: North Yemen Civil War begins.
- 1963: Ba'athists and Arab nationalist sympathizers in the army engineer Ramadan Revolution seeing the government as insufficiently pan-Arabic and pro-Communist.
- 1963: The White Revolution, a series of major economic reforms by Shah Mohammad Reza Pahlavi intended to effect industrial development and redistribute rural land in Iran, though popular also increase social tensions leading to massive pro-Islamic rioting in June.
- 1963: Birth of great Historian Mudaser Ijaz at Old Anarkali, Lahore, Pakistan
- 1965: American Muslim leader Malcolm X is assassinated. The second Indo-Pakistani War results in a stalemate. Malaysia grants independence to Singapore. In Indonesia, anti-communist witch-hunts give political Islamists an advantage over Communists.
- 1967: In the Six-Day War between Israel and Egypt, Syria and Jordan, Israel seizes control of Jerusalem, the West Bank, Gaza Strip, the Sinai Peninsula, and the Golan Heights. More Palestinians are displaced.
- 1967: Beginning of Infitah policy in Egypt as Sadat moves away from Soviet Union in wake of Six-Day War.
- 1967: People's Republic of South Yemen becomes independent.
- 1967: Biafra attempts to secede from Nigeria triggering Nigerian Civil War.
- 1968: The enlargement of the Haram in Mecca is completed. Israel begins building Jewish settlements in territories occupied during the Six-day War.
- 1968: Ba'ath Party stages a bloodless military coup in Iraq.
- 1969: King Idris of Libya is ousted by a coup led by Colonel Qadhdhafi.
- 1970: Death of Gamal Abdel Nasser, Anwar Sadat becomes president of Egypt and continues preparation of the army for the next war with Israel.
- 1971: Bengalis in East Pakistan under the leadership of Sheikh Mujibur Rahman begin campaigning for independence from West Pakistan, prompting a heavy-handed military reprisal from Pakistani forces. India enters the conflict, causing the third Indo-Pakistani War which culminates in the creation of Bangladesh.
- 1972: During the Summer Olympic Games in Munich, West Germany, eleven members of the Israeli Olympic team were taken hostage by Palestinian terrorist group Black September in what is known as the Munich massacre.
- 1973: Mohammad Zahir Shah of Afghanistan is overthrown.
- 1973: Yom Kippur War, also known as 1973 Arab-Israeli War, amounting to a failed attempt to recapture the Sinai peninsula and Golan Heights by Egypt and Syria from Israel.
- 1974: Beginning of Infitah policy in Egypt, announced by Sadat in an "October paper," representing a move away from Nasser-era socialism, an opening to western capital and a withdrawal from dependency on the USSR
- 1974: Organisation of Islamic Cooperation conference held in Lahore. Ahmadis declared kafir (non-Muslim) in Islamic Republic of Pakistan.
- 1974: Turkey launched a military invasion on Cyprus 1974 following the coup d'état engineered by the Greek junta.
- 1975: Indonesia invades and occupies East Timor.
- 1975: King Faisal of Saudi Arabia is assassinated by his half-brother's son Faisal bin Musa'id.
- 1975: Death of Elijah Muhammad, leader of Nation of Islam among African Americans in North America. Warith Deen Muhammad assumes leadership of Nation of Islam and shifts movement toward Islamic Orthodoxy, renaming it American Muslim Mission.
- 1975: Sectarian civil war begins in Lebanon. Before it would end in 1991 outside powers, including Syria and Israel, would become involved, more than 100,000 would die and a million refugees would leave Lebanon.
- 1977: General Zia ul-Haq topples Prime Minister Bhutto in bloodless coup. Zia committed himself to a policy of "Islamization" of Pakistan.
- 1978: Imam Musa Sadr, a Lebanese Shi'a leader is apparently assassinated after he disappears on a trip to Libya.
- 1978: As part of the Camp David Accords, Egypt becomes the first Arab nation to recognize Israel. Israel returns the Sinai Peninsula to Egypt.
- 1978: Communist People's Democratic Party of Afghanistan seized power in Afghanistan in the Saur Revolution. Civil war ensues.
- 1979: Years of political tension and unrest in Iran climax as the autocratic Pahlavi regime is overthrown by a popular revolution. In its place, Iranian clerics led by Ayatollah Ruhollah Khomeini establish an Islamic government and declare Iran an Islamic Republic. Groups of students loyal to the new regime seize control of the American embassy in Tehran and take 66 officials hostage.
- 1979: Religious students in Saudi Arabia seize control of the Haram of Mecca, sparking a two-week standoff with Saudi security forces. The crisis comes to an end when Saudi forces storm the mosque, killing 237 of the 300 men and apprehending the remainder. All surviving conspirators in the plot are publicly executed.
- 1979: The Soviet Union invades Afghanistan.
- 1979: Death of influential Islamist leader Sayyid Abul Ala Maududi.
- 1980: Muhammad Asad publishes his Magnum opus The Message of The Qur'an
- 1980: Iraq invades Iran, beginning the 8-year Iran–Iraq War.
- 1980: In a move not recognized internationally, Israel confirms its capital as the united Jerusalem.
- 1980: General Evren deposes Turkish prime minister in a coup in which 500,000 were arrested. The military would rule for three years, then Evren acted as president until the end of 1989.
- 1981: The 444-day Iranian hostage crisis comes to an end. Egyptian president Anwar Sadat is assassinated by militants opposed to his autocratic policies and recognition of Israel. Succeeded by Muhammad Hosni Mubarak.
- 1982: Israel invades Lebanon.
- 1983; Second Sudanese Civil War breaks out after central government attempts to impose shariah law on non-Muslims. Two million would die in the course of the 22-year war, which resulted in the grant of automy to the southern part of the state.
- 1987: First Intifada begins as Palestinians engage in widespread civil disobedience and strikes. The uprising lasts until 1993.
- 1988: The Iran–Iraq War ends in a stalemate.
- 1988: First Nagorno-Karabakh War, an ethnic conflict between ethnic Armenians and supported by the Republic of Armenia in the southeast corner of former Soviet Republic Azerbaijan.
- 1988: President Muhammad Zia-ul-Haq of Pakistan was killed in a plane crash caused by a mysterious mid-air explosion.
- 1988: "October riots," a series of demonstrations and other street disturbances mainly by young people, take place in Algeria, contributing to the pressure which together with dismal economic conditions led to the abandonment of the one party system and adoption of a constitution with democratic elements.
- 1988 Death of Abdul Haq on 7 September 1988, at the age of 74 or 76, at Khyber Teaching Hospital in Peshawar, NWFP, Pakistan.
- 1989: On 14 February Shia religious leader and Iranian head of state Ayatollah Ruhollah Khomeini issues fatwā calling on "zealous Muslims" to kill Salman Rushdie and the publishers of Satanic Verses, which is proclaimed a libel against "islam, the Prophet, and the Koran."
- 1989: On 3 June Ayatollas Kohmeini dies and is succeeded by Ali Khamenei as the Supreme Leader of Iran.
- 1989: The Soviet Union withdraws the last of its forces from Afghanistan. Afghan mujahideen factions begin fighting each other.
- 1990: Iraq invades Kuwait.
- 1990: North Yemen and South Yemen reunite.
- 1991: A coalition of United States-led forces attacks Iraq and reverses its attempted military annexation of Kuwait. US-backed economic sanctions are imposed on Iraq. The sanctions are widely blamed for subsequent dramatic increases in famine, birth defects, and infant mortality amongst Iraqis.
- 1991: The Soviet Union collapses. Azerbaijan, Kazakhstan, Kyrgyzstan, Tajikistan, Turkmenistan, and Uzbekistan, all predominantly Muslim former Soviet republics, become independent. Armenian military occupies one-sixth of Azerbaijani territory expelling over 800,000 ethnic Azerbaijanis from the occupied lands and Armenia proper.
- 1991: United Somali Congress topples regime of military dictator Siad Barre. The national military forces disband and form regional militias as part of Somali Civil War.
- 1991: Algerian Civil War begins after Islamic party Islamic Salvation Front (Front Islamique du Salut (FIS)), which opposed state planning and supported state implementation of sharia laws, wins substantial majority of first stage of parliamentary elections. A military coup takes place and the FIS is banned and leaders imprisoned. The war would last until 2002.
- 1992: The 400-year-old Babri Masjid in Ayodhya, India is destroyed by Hindu extremists, sparking widespread religious rioting across India.
- 1992: United Nations Forces, mainly Americans, enter Somalia.
- 1993: Oslo I Accord between Israel and PLO signed.
- 1994: Jordan becomes the second of Israel's Arab neighbors to recognize Israel.
- 1994: First war between Russia and Chechen Republic begins.
- 1995: Israel Prime Minister Yitzhak Rabin assassinated by right-wing orthodox Jew over Oslo Accord.
- 1996: Taliban forces seize control of most of Afghanistan and declare the Islamic Emirate of Afghanistan.
- 1996: Mullah Omar was acknowledged by a group of around 2,000 scholars, who bestowed upon him the title of "Amir al-Mu'minin" (Commander of the Faithful). This title is historically given to the leaders of the caliphate in the Islamic world, reflecting his position as the leader of the Muslim community in Afghanistan.
- 1996: Muhsin Hendricks came out as gay, becoming the first openly queer imam.
- 1996: After leading his Welfare Party to a surprise victory in the 1995 general elections, Necmettin Erbakan becomes the first pro-Islamic Prime Minister of modern Turkey.
- 1996: Al Jazeera Satellite Channel with loan from the Emir of Qatar launches Arab language satellite news service.
- 1998: Pakistan becomes the first Islamic republic to have the nuclear power as it successfully conducted five nuclear tests on May 28.
- 1998: Amidst growing criticism of his economic policies, longtime Indonesian leader General Suharto resigns after over thirty years in power.
- 1998: Former deputy prime minister of Malaysia Anwar Ibrahim, a vocal critic of prime minister Mahathir Mohamad, is arrested and imprisoned on charges of sodomy.
- 1998: Bombing of US Embassies in Nairobi and Dar es Salaam engineered by Al-Qaeda.
- 1999: Kargil war breaks out between Pakistan and India. Pakistan's Army loses possession of the peaks that it had occupied as part of Operation Badr in Indian-administered Kashmir. Jockeying for strategic peaks follow after fighting officially ends in late-July 1999, with Indians gaining control of a number of features on the Pakistani side of the LoC viz Point 5310, Point 5070, Anzbari feature, amongst others.
- 1999: Death of Jordan's King Hussein. King Hussein's son Abdullah is declared king of Jordan.
- 1999: Indonesia relinquishes control of East Timor, which is granted independence under a UN-sponsored act of self-determination.
- 1999: General Pervez Musharraf seizes control of Pakistan after a military coup against the government of Prime Minister Nawaz Sharif.
- 2000: Palestinians in the West Bank and Gaza Strip begin the Al-Aqsa Intifada, prompted by Ariel Sharon's visit to a disputed religious site holy to both Jews and Muslims.
- 2000: President Hafez al-Assad of Syria dies of a heart attack. His son Bashar al-Assad is elected President by Syria's Majlis Al Shaa'b (Parliament).
- 2000: Russia occupies Grozny, the capital of Chechnya, in Second Chechen War.
- 2000: General Pervez Musharraf overthrows the democratically elected government of Nawaz Sharif in Pakistan.
- 2000: Suicide attack on USS Cole kills 17 US sailors.
- By the end of this century, global Muslim population had grown to almost one-fifth (20%) of the total driven by improved healthcare infrastructure.

== See also ==
- Timeline of Muslim history
- List of 20th-century religious leaders
