= Timeline of the history of Islam (12th century) =

Timeline of the history of Islam: 6th | 7th | 8th | 9th | 10th | 11th | 12th | 13th | 14th | 15th | 16th | 17th | 18th | 19th | 20th | 21st century

== 12th century (1101–1200) (494 AH – 597 AH) ==
- 1101: Death of the Fatimid Caliph al-Musta'li, accession of al-Amir Bi-Ahkamillah.
- 1105: Death of the Seljuk Sultan Barkiyaruq, accession Of Mehmed I of Great Seljuk.
- 1106: Death of the Al Moravid Yusuf bin Tashfin.
- 1107: Death of the Rum Seljuk Sultan Kilij Arslan I, succession of Malik Shah of Rüm.
- 1108: Death of the Zirid dynasty ruler Tamin, accession of Yahya of Zirid.
- 1111: Persian Islamic jurist and philosopher Al-Ghazali dies.
- 1116: Death of the Rum Seljuk Sultan Malik Shah; accession of Mas'ud of Rüm.
- 1118: Death of the Seljuk Sultan Muhammad; accession of Mahmud II of Great Seljuk. Death of the Abbasid Caliph al-Mustazhir, accession of al-Mustarshid. In Spain the Christians capture Zaragoza.
- 1121: Death of the Fatimid ruler Al-Amir bi-Ahkami l-Lah, accession of Al-Hafiz.
- 1127: Imad ad-Din Zengi establishes the Zengid dynasty rule In Mosul.
- 1128: Death of the Khawarzam Shah Qutb ud Din Muhammad; accession of Atsiz.
- 1130: Death of the Seljuk Sultan Mahmud II of Great Seljuk; accession of Toghrül II.
- 1135: Assassination of the Abbasid Caliph al-Mustarshid; accession of al-Rashid. Death of the Seljuk Sultan Toghrül II, accession of Mas'ud of Great Seljuk.
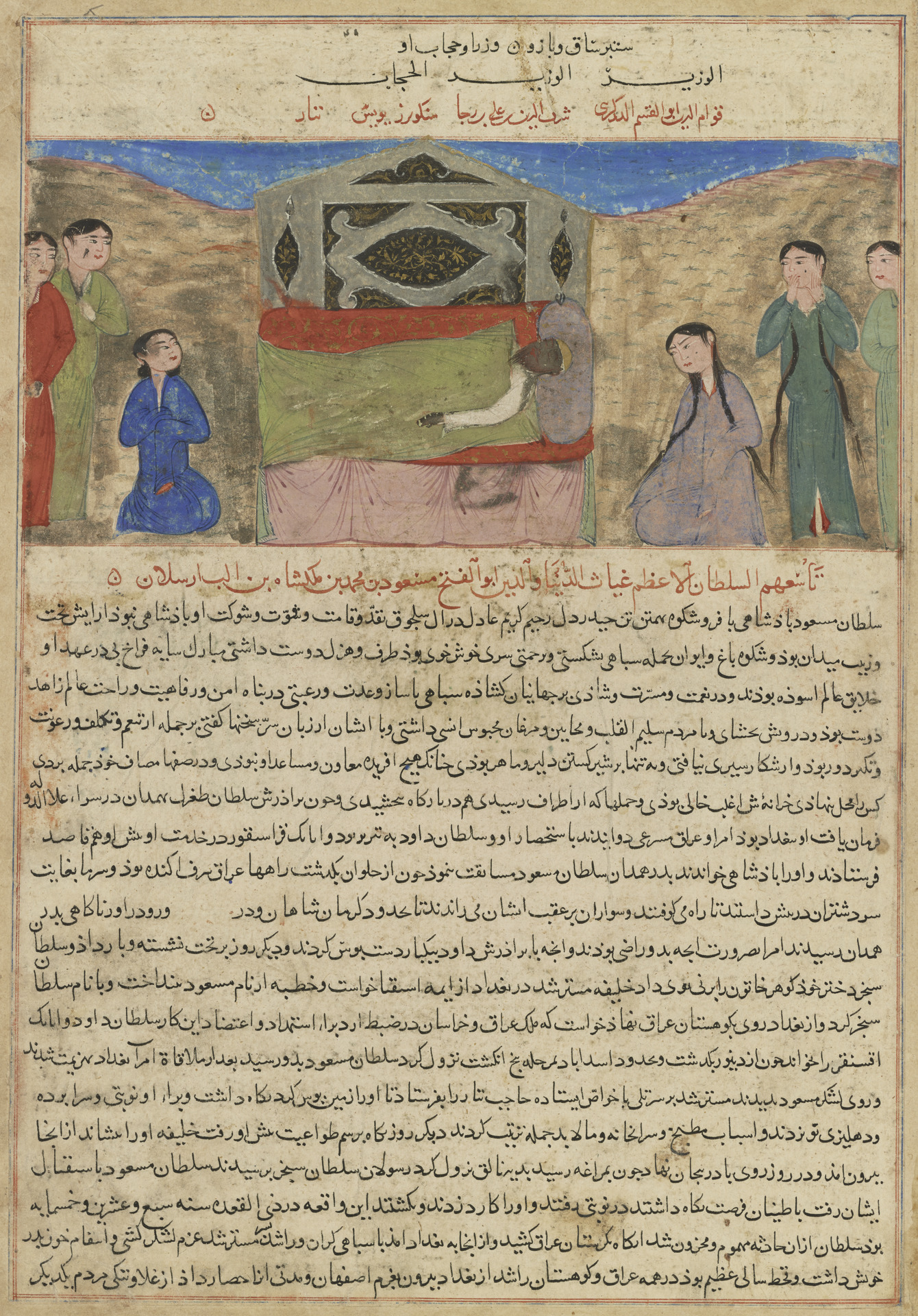
  Death of Al-Mustarshid bi-llah who was assassinated in the year 1135
- 1136: Deposition of the Abbasid Caliph Al-Rashid, accession of Al-Muqtafi.
- 1144: Zengi captures Edessa from the Christians, Second Crusade.
- 1146: Death of Zengi, accession of Nur ad-Din.
- 1147: In the Maghreb Al Moravids overthrown by the Almohad under Abd al-Mu'min.
- 1148: End of the Zirid dynasty rule' in North Africa. Siege of Damascus repulsed, thus effectively winning the Second Crusade.
- 1149: Death of the Fatimid Caliph al-Hafiz, accession of Az-Zafir.
- 1152: Death of the Seljuk Sultan Mas'ud of Great Seljuk, accession of Malik Shah III. Hamadid rule extinguished in North Africa.
- 1153: Death of the Seljuk Sultan Malik Shah III, accession of Mehmed II of Great Seljuk.
- 1154: Death of the Fatimid Caliph az-Zafir, accession of Al-Faiz.
- 1156: Death of the Rum Seljuk Sultan Mas'ud of Rüm, accession of Kilij Arslan II.
- 1159: Death of the Seljuk Sultan Mehmed II of Great Seljuk, accession of Suleiman.
- 1160: Death of the Abbasid Caliph al-Muqtafi, accession of al-Mustanjid. Death of the Fatimid Caliph al-Faiz, accession of al-Adid.
- 1161: Death of the Seljuk Süleyman of Great Seljuk, accession of Arslan Shah.
- 1163: Death of the Almohad ruler Abd al-Mu'min, accession of Yusuf I, Almohad Caliph.
- Ghiyath al-Din Ghori ascended the Ghurid throne.
- 1170: Death of the Abbasid Caliph Al-Mustanjid, accession of Al-Mustadi.
- 1171: Death of the Fatimid Caliph Al-Adid. End of the Fatimid caliphate. Saladin founds the Ayyubid dynasty in Egypt.
- 1172: Death of the Khawarzam Shah Arsalan, accession of Sultan Shah.
- 1173: The Khawarzam Shah Sultan Shah is overthrown by Tukush Shah, Muhammad of Ghor crowned in Ghazni
- 1174: Saladin annexes Syria.
- 1175: The Ghurid ruler Muhammad of Ghor expeditions in Indian subcontinent begins with the conquest of Multan from the Ismail Muslims.
- 1176: Death of the Seljuk Sultan Arslan Shah, accession of Toghrül III.
- 1176: Muhammad of Ghor captured Uch from either the Bhati Rajputs or more likely from the Qarmatians.
- 1178: Muhammad of Ghor routed in Mount Abu by Chaulukya ruler Mularaja II
- 1179: Death of the Abbasid Caliph al-Mustadi, accession of an-Nasir, Muhammad of Ghor annexed Peshawar
- 1182: Muhammad of Ghor captured Sindh
- 1185: Death of the Almohad ruler Abu Yaqub Yusuf, accession of Abu Yusuf Yaqub al-Mansur, Khusrau Malik laid siege to Sialkot, but was driven away by Husain ibn Kharmil
- 1186: The Ghurids overthrow the Ghaznavid in the Punjab.
- 1187: Saladin recaptures Jerusalem from the Christians, Third Crusade.
- 1190: Ghiyath al-Din Ghori and Muhammad Ghori along with their allies routed Sultan Shah in Battle of Merv.
- 1191: First Battle of Tarain between the Rajputs and the Ghurids, where the former emerged victorious
- Khusrau Malik and his family executed in Firuzkuh
- 1192: Second Battle of Tarain, Ghurids defeated the Rajputs.
- 1193: Death of Saladin; accession of Al-Aziz Uthman, Minhaj-i-Siraj, the author of Tabaqat i-Nasiri born.
- 1194: Occupation of Delhi by the Muslims. End of the Seljuk rule.
- 1199: Death of the Khawarzam Shah Tukush Shah. Death of the Almohad ruler Abu Yusuf Yaqub al-Mansur; accession of Muhammad an-Nasir. Conquest of Northern India and Bengal by the Ghurids.

== See also ==
Timeline of Muslim history
