= Timeline of the history of Islam (6th century) =

This is a timeline of major events in the Muslim world from 501 AD to 600 AD (126 BH – 23 BH).

Timeline of the history of Islam: 6th | 7th | 8th | 9th | 10th | 11th | 12th | 13th | 14th | 15th | 16th | 17th | 18th | 19th | 20th | 21st century

== 6th century (501–1600) ==
This century corresponds to approximately 126 – 23 BH.

- 570: Year of the Elephant. 50–60 days before Muhammad's birth, Abraha, the Viceroy of Yemen, reaches Mecca with his army of elephants to demolish the Kaaba.
- 570: Birth of Muhammad.
- 573: Birth of Abu Bakr, the senior companion of Muhammad and his father-in-law.
- 576: Death of Aminah bint Wahb, the mother of Muhammad (approximate date).
- 576: Birth of Uthman, the second cousin and twice son-in-law of Muhammad.
- 578: Death of Abdul Muttalib, the grandfather of Muhammad (approximate date).
- 579/582: Muhammad travels to Syria with his uncle Abu Talib. There, Bahira, a Christian monk, claims that Muhammad possesses the mark of an Abrahamic prophet. (Approximate date).
- 582: Birth of Umar, the senior companion of Muhammad and his father-in-law.
- 594: Muhammad leads Khadija's trade caravan to Syria and back (approximate date).
- 595: Muhammad marries Khadija (approximate date).
- 598: Birth of Muhammad and Khadija's first child, Qasim ibn Muhammad.
- 599: Birth of Ali ibn Abi Talib in the city of Mecca. The cousin of Muhammad and his son in law.
- 600: Birth of Muhammad and Khadija's eldest daughter and second child Zainab.
- 600: Death of Muhammad's first child Qasim.

== See also ==
- Muhammad in Mecca
- Religion in pre-Islamic Arabia
