= Timeline of the history of Islam (14th century) =

Timeline of the history of Islam: 6th | 7th | 8th | 9th | 10th | 11th | 12th | 13th | 14th | 15th | 16th | 17th | 18th | 19th | 20th | 21st century

The names of people, battles, and places need to be spelled as they are on other articles title and then wikified.

== 14th century (1301–1400) (700 AH – 803 AH) ==
- 1301: In Bengal, Rukunuddin Kaikaus, the king of Bengal dies and is succeeded by his brother Shamsuddin Firoz Shah.
- 1302: In Granada, Muhammad II dies and is succeeded by Muhammad III.
- 1304: In the Mongol Ilkhanate, Ghazan dies and is succeeded by his brother Khudabanda Oljeitu.
- 1304: In Algeria, Uthman dies and is succeeded by his son Abu Zayyan Muhammad.
- 1305: In the Khalji Empire, Alauddin Khalji conquers Rajputana.
- 1306: In the Chagatai Khanate, Duwa dies and is succeeded by his son Konchek.
- 1307: In Morocco, the Marinid Sultan Abu Yaqub Yusuf is assassinated; Abu Thabit accedes to the throne.
- 1308: In the Chagatai Khanate, Konchek is deposed and Taliqu takes power.
- 1308: In Algeria, Abu Zayyan Muhammad and is succeeded by his brother Abu Hammu Musa. In Morocco, Abu Thabit is overthrown by Abu'l-Rabi Sulayman.
- 1309: In the Chagatai Khanate, Taliku is assassinated and Kebek accedes.
- 1309: In Granada, Muhammad III is overthrown by his uncle Abul Juyush Nasr.
- 1310: In the Chagatai Khanate, Kebek is overthrown by his brother Isan Buga.
- 1310: In Morocco, Abu'l Rabi Sulayman is overthrown by Abu Said Uthman.
- 1310: In the Khaljis empire, Alauddin conquers the Deccan.
- 1312: In Tunisia, Abul Baqa is overthrown by Al Lihiani.
- 1313: The Ilkhanate invades Syria, but the Mongols are repulsed.
- 1313: In the Golden Horde Empire, Toktu dies and is succeeded by his nephew Uzbeg.
- 1314: In Kashmir, Rinchan, an adventurer from Baltistan, overthrows Sinha Deva the Raja of Kashmir. Rinchan is converted to Islam and adopts the name of Sultan Sadruddin.
- 1314: In Granada, Abul Juyush is overthrown by his nephew Abul Wahid Ismail.
- 1315: In Tunisia, War breaks out between Bougie and Tunis; Lihani is defeated and killed. Abu Bakr becomes the ruler of Bougie and Tunis.
- 1316: In the Ilkhanate, Oljeitu dies and is succeeded by Abu Said.
- 1316: In the Khaljis Empire, Alauddin dies and Shahabuddin Umar accedes; Malik Kafur, a Hindu convert, usurps power.
- 1318: In the Khalji Empire, Malik Kafur is assassinated, Shahabuddin Umar is deposed, and Qutbuddin Mubarak accedes. In the Chagatai Khanate, Isan Buga is overthrown by Kebek.
- 1320: In the Khalji Empire, Qutbuddin Mubarak is assassinated; Khusro Khan, a Hindu convert, usurps power. Khusro Khan is overthrown by Ghazi Malik. End of the Khalji Dynasty.
- 1320: In Tunisia, Abu Bakr is expelled from Tunis by Abu Imran.
- 1320: In the Tughluq empire, Ghazi Malik founds the Tughluq dynasty.
- 1321: In the Chagatai Khanate, Kebek is succeeded by Hebbishsi, who is later overthrown by Duwa Timur.
- 1322: In the Chagatai Khanate, Duwa Timur is overthrown by Tarmashirin, who converts to Islam.
- 1320: In Bengal, Shamsuddin Firuz dies. The kingdom is divided into two parts. Ghiasuddin Bahadur becomes the ruler of East Bengal with the capital at Sonargaon, Shahabuddin becomes the ruler of West Bengal with the capital at Lakhnauti.
- 1324: In Bengal, Shahabuddin dies and is succeeded by his brother Nasiruddin.
- 1325: In the Tughluq Empire, Ghazi Malik (Ghiasuddin Tughluq) dies and is succeeded by his son Muhammad Tughluq.
- 1325: In Granada, Abul Wahid Ismail is assassinated; he is succeeded by his son Muhammad IV, who is himself assassinated. His brother Abul Hallaj Yusuf accedes to the throne. In the Samudra Pasai empire, Malik al Tahir I dies and is succeeded by Malik al Tahir II.
- 1325: In Bengal, with the help of Ghiasuddin Tughluq, Nasiruddin over-throws Ghiasuddin Bahadur and unites Bengal.
- 1326: In the Ottoman Empire, Osman I dies and is succeeded by Orhan. Orhan conquers Bursa and makes it his capital.
- 1327: The Ottoman Turks capture the city of (Iznik).
- 1329: In the Tughluq empire, Muhammad Tughluq shifts the capital from Delhi to Daulatabad in the Deccan.
- 1330: In the Chagatai Khanate, Tarmashirin dies and is succeeded by Changshahi. Amir Hussan establishes the Jalairid Sultanate at Baghdad. In Tunisia, Abu Bakr overthrows Abu Imran, and the state is again united under him. In Bengal, Muhammad bin Tughluq reverses the policy of his father and restores Ghiasuddin Bahadur to the throne of Sonargaon.
- 1331: In the Marinid Empire, Abu Said Othman dies and is succeeded by Abul Hasan. The Tughluqs annex Bengal.
- 1335: In the Ilkhanate, Abu Said dies, and Arpa Koun assumes power. In the Chagatai Khanate, Changshahi is assassinated; Burun accedes to the throne.
- 1336: In the Ilkhanate, Arpa is defeated and killed, and Musa succeeds him. Amir Timur is born. In the Jalayar empire, Amir Hussain dies and is succeeded by Hasan Buzurg. The Ottoman Empire annexes the state of Karesi. In Bengal, the Tughluq governor at Sonargaon is assassinated by an armour bearer, who takes power and declares his independence; he assumes the name Fakhruddin Mubarak Shah.
- 1337: In the Ilkhanate, Musa is overthrown, and Muhammad becomes the Sultan. In the Sarbadaran Empire, on the disintegration of the II-Khan rule, Abdur Razaq a military adventurer establishes an independent principality in Khurasan with the capital at Sabzwar. In Persia, upon the disintegration of the Ilkhanate, Mubarazud Din Muhammad establishes the Muzaffarid Empire. In the Ottoman Empire, The Ottomans capture the city of Nicomedia (İzmit). In Algeria, Algeria is occupied by Marinids.
- 1338: In the Ilkhanate, Muhammad is overthrown and succeeded by Sati Beg. Sati Beg marries Sulaiman who becomes the co-ruler.
- 1339: In Kashmir, Sadrud Din dies, and his throne is captured by a Hindu, Udyana Deva. In the Chagatai Khanate, Burun is deposed by Isun Timur. In Bengal, the Tughluq governor at Lakhnauti, Qadr Khan, is assassinated, and power is assumed by the army commander-in-chief, who declares his independence and assumes the title of Alauddin Ali Shah.
- 1340: The Muzaffarid Empire conquers Kirman. In the Chagatai Khanate, Isun Timur is deposed by Muhammad.
- 1341: In the Golden Horde empire, Uzbeg dies and is succeeded by his son Tini Beg.
- 1342: In the Golden Horde empire, Tini Beg is overthrown by his brother Jani Beg.
- 1343: In the Chagatai Khanate, Muhammad is overthrown, and power is captured by Kazan. In Bengal, Ilyas, an officer of Alauddin, murders his patron and captures the throne of West Bengal.
- 1344: In the Ilkhanate, Sulaiman is deposed by Anusherwan.
- 1345: In the Samudra Pasai Empire, Malik al Tahir II dies and is succeeded by Tahir III. His rule lasts throughout the 14th century. In Bengal, llyas captures East Bengal, and under him Bengal is again united. He establishes his capital at Gaur.
- 1346: In the Chagatai Khanate, Kazan is deposed by Hayan Kuli. In Tunisia, Abu Bakr dies and is succeeded by his son Fadal. In Kashmir, Udyana Deva dies and the throne is taken by Shah Mirza, who assumes the name of Shah Mir and founds the Shah Mir Dynasty.
- 1347: The Marinids capture Tunisia. In the Bahmanid Empire, Hasan Gangu declares his independence and establishes a state in the Deccan with the capital at Gulbarga.
- 1349: In Kashmir, Shah Mir dies and is succeeded by his son Jamsbed. In Algeria, The Zayanids under Abu Said Othman recapture Algeria.
- 1350: In the Sarbadaran Empire, a revolt erupts against Abdur Razaq. Power is captured by Amir Masud. In Tunisia, Fadal is deposed and succeeded by his brother Abu Ishaq. In Kashmir, Jamshed is overthrown by his step brother Alauddin Ali Sher.
- 1351: In the Marinid Empire, Abul Hasan dies, and is succeeded by Abu Inan. In the Tughluq Empire, Muhammad Tughluq dies and Firuz Shah Tughluq assumes power.
- 1352: The Marinids again capture Algeria. Abu Said Othman is taken captive and killed.
- 1353: The Ilkhanate ends. The Ottoman Empire acquires the fortress of Tympa on the European side of the Hollespoint. The Muzaffarids conquer Shiraz and establish their capital there.
- 1354: The Muzaffarids annex Isfahan. In Granada, Abu Hallaj Yusuf is assassinated; his son Muhammad V succeeds him.
- 1356: In the Jalayar Empire, Death of Hasan Buzurg, succession of his son Owaia.
- 1357: In the Golden Horde Empire, Death of Jani Beg, succession of Berdi Beg.
- 1358: In the Bahmanid Empire, Death of Hasan Gangu, accession of his son Muhammad Shah. In the Muzaffarid Empire, Death of Mubarazuddin Muhammad; accession of Shah Shuja. In the Marinid Empire, Assassination of Abu Inan, succession of Abu Bakr Said. In Bengal, Death of Ilyas, succession of his son Sikandar Shah.
- 1359: In the Ottoman Empire, Death of Orhan, succession of Murad I. In the Muzaffarid Empire, Shah Shuja deposed by his brother Shah Mahmud. In Tunisia, Abul Abbas a nephew of Abu Ishaq revolts and establishes his rule in Bougie. In Algeria, The Zayanids under Abu Hamuw II recapture Algeria. In the Marinid Empire, Abu Bakr Said overthrown by Abu Salim Ibrahim. In Granada, Muhammad V loses the throne in palace revolution, succeeded by Ismail. In the Golden Horde, Death of Berdi Beg, succession of Qulpa.
- 1360: In the Muzaffarid Empire, Death of Shah Mahmud. Shah Shuja recaptures power. In the Chagatai Khanate, Power captured by Tughluq Timur. In Granada, Ismail overthrown by his brother-in-law Abu Said.
- 1361: In the Ottoman Empire, Murad I conquers a part of Thrace and establishes his capital at Edirne(Hadriaunus) in Thrace. In the Golden Horde empire, Kulpa overthrown by his brother Nauroz. In the Marinid Empire, Abu Salim Ibrahim overthrown by Abu Umar. Abu Umar overthrown by Abu Zayyan.
- 1362: In the Golden Horde empire, State of anarchy. During 20 years as many as 14 rulers came to the throne and made their exit. In Granada, Abu Said overthrown by Muhammad V who comes to rule for the second time. In Kashmir, Death of Alauddin Ali Sher, succeeded by his brother Shahabuddin.
- 1365: In the Ottoman Empire, The Turks defeat a Christian army at the battle of Maritza (Sirp Sindigi). The Byzantine ruler becomes a vassal of the Turks.
- 1366: In the Marinids empire, Assassination of Abu Zayyan, succession of Abu Faris Abdul Aziz.
- 1369: Power captured by Amir Timur. End of the rule of the Chughills. Amir Timur captures power in Transoxiana. In Tunisia, Death of Abu Ishaq. Succession of his son Abu Baqa Khalid.
- 1370: In Tunisia, Abu Baqa overthrown by Abul Abbas under whom the state is reunited. In the Sarbadaran empire, Death of Amir Masud, succession of Muhammad Timur.
- 1371: In the Ottoman Empire, Invasion of Bulgaria, Bulgarian territory up to the Balkans annexed by the Turks.
- 1372: In the Marinid Empire, Death of Abu Faris, succession of Abu Muhammad.
- 1374: In the Marinid Empire, Abu Muhammad overthrown by Abul Abbas.
- 1375: In the Sarbadaran Empire, Deposition of Muhammad Aytimur, power captured by Shamsuddin. In the Jalayar empire, Death of Owais, succession by his son Hussain.
- 1376: In Kashmir, Death of Shahabuddin, succeeded by his brother Qutbuddin.
- 1377: In the Bahmanids empire, death of Muhammad Shah, succeeded by his son Mujahid.
- 1378: In the Bahmanids empire, assassination of Mujahid, the throne being seized by his uncle Dawud.
- 1379: Turkomans of the Black Sheep empire, Bairam Khawaja found the independent principality of the Turkomans of the Black Sheep and established his capital at Van in Armenia. In the Bahmanids empire, Assassination of Daud; accession of Muhammad Khan.
- 1380: In the Golden Horde empire, Power is captured by Tokhtamysh, a prince of the White Horde of Siberia. In Amir Timur's empire, Amir Timur crosses the Oxus and conquers Khurasan and Herat. Amir Timur invades Persia and subjugates the Muzaffarids and Mazandaran.
- 1381: In Amir Timur's empire, annexation of Sistan, capture of Qandhar.
- 1384: In Amir Timur's empire, conquest of Astrabad, Mazandaran, Rey and Sultaniyah. In the Muzaffarids empire, Death of Shah Shuja, accession of his son Zainul Abdin. In the Marinid Empire, Abul Abbas overthrown by Mustansir. Turkomans of the Black Sheep empire, Death of Bairam Khawaja, succession of Qara Muhammad.
- 1386: In Amir Timur's empire, Annexation of Azarbaijan, Georgia overrun. Subjugation of Gilan and Shirvan. Turkomans of the Black Sheep defeated. In the Marinid Empire, Death of Mustansir, succession of Muhammad.
- 1387: In the Marinid Empire, Muhammad overthrown by Abul Abbas who comes to power for the second time.
- 1388: In Algeria, death of Abu Hamuw II, succession of Abu Tashfin. In the Tughluqs empire, Death of Firuz Shah Tughluq, succeeded by his grandson Ghiasuddin Tughluq II.
- 1389: In the Muzaffarid Empire, death of the poet Hafiz Shirazi. In the Tughluqs empire, Death of Ghiasuddin Tughluq II, accession: of Abu Bakr Tughluq Shah. Turkomans of the Black Sheep empire, death of Qara Muhammad. succession of Qara Yusuf. In Ottoman Empire Murad I fought the Battle of Kosovo against Christian army from Serbia, Croatia, Bosnia, Hungary and Wallachia. Murad I was assassinated at the end of this battle and Yildirim Beyazid I became the new Sultan.
- 1390: In the Tughluqs empire, Abu Bakr overthrow by Nasiruddin Tughluq. In Bengal, Death of Sikandar Shah, accession of his son Ghiasud. In the Burji Mamluks empire, The rule of the Burji Mamluks rounded by Saifuddin Barquq. In Tunisia, the city of Mahdia is besieged by a French crusader army.
- 1391: In Amir Timur's empire, Annexation of Fars. In the Muzaffarid Empire, Annexation of the Muzaffarids by Amir Timur. In Granada, Death of Muhammad V, succession of his son Abu Hallaj Yusuf II.
- 1392: In the Jalayar empire, Death of Hussain, succession of his son Ahmad. In Granada, Death of Abu Hallaj; succession of Muhammad VI.
- 1393: Amir Timur defeats Tiktomish, the ruler of the Golden Horde. Capture of the Jalayar dominions by Amir Timur. In the Marinid Empire, Death of Abul Abbas; succession of Abu Faris II.
- 1394: Amir Timur defeats the Duke of Moscow. In the Tughluqs empire, Death of Nasiruddin Tugluq, accession of Alauddin Sikandar Shah. In Kashmir, Death of Qutbuddin. Turkomans of the White Sheep empire, Qara Othman established the rule of the White Sheep Turkomans in Diyarbekr.
- 1395: In the Golden Horde empire, Amir Timur defeated Toktamish and razes Serai to the ground. End of the rule of the Golden Horde. Annexation of Iraq by Amir Timur. In the Tughluqs empire, Death of Sikandar Shah. Accession of Muhammad Shah.
- 1396: In the Amir Timur's empire, Destruction of Sarai, and of the rule of the Golden Horde. In the Sarbadaran empire, Principality annexed by Amir Timur. In Ottoman Empire Sultan Yildirim Beyazid I at the Battle of Nicopoli defeated an army of Christian Crusaders.
- 1397: In the Bahmanids empire, Death of Muhammad Khan.
- 1398: In the Amir Timur's empire, Campaign in India. In the Marinid Empire, Death of Abu Faris II. In the Tughluqs empire, Invasion of Amir Timur, Mahmud Shah escapes from the capital. In Morocco, Death of the Marinid Sultan Abu Faris II; succession of his son Abu Said Othman.
- 1399: In the Amir Timur's empire, Campaign in Iraq and Syria. In the Burji Mamluks empire, Death of Saifuddin Barquq, succession of his son Nasiruddin in Faraj. By the end of this century, global Muslim population had grown to 8 per cent of the total.

== See also ==
- Timeline of Muslim history
