= Timeline of the history of Islam (16th century) =

Timeline of the history of Islam: 6th | 7th | 8th | 9th | 10th | 11th | 12th | 13th | 14th | 15th | 16th | 17th | 18th | 19th | 20th | 21st century

== 16th century (1501–1599) (906 AH – 1009 AH) ==
=== 1500–1509 ===
==== Iran ====
- 1501: Ismail I establishes the Safavid dynasty, and Twelver Shi'ism becomes the state religion.
- 1507: The Kingdom of Portugal under Alfonso d'Albuquerque establishes trading outposts in the Persian Gulf.

==== Golden Horde ====
- 1502: The Golden Horde collapses into a number of smaller khanates.

==== Ak Koyunlu ====
- 1508: Ak Koyunlu is absorbed by the Safavids.

=== 1510–1519 ===
==== Malaysia ====
- 1511: D'Albuquerque conquers Malacca.

==== Kazakh Khanate ====
- 1511: Burunduk Khan is deposed by the people and exiled to Samarkand, where he dies. His cousin Qasim bin Janibek Khan succeeds him as the fourth ruler of the Kazakh Khanate.
- 1515: The Kazakhs under Qasim bin Janibek Khan conquer all of modern-day Kazakhstan after a decisive victory in battle over Qasim's cousin Muhammad Shaybani, ruler of the Uzbek Khanate. The Kazakhs rule all of modern-day Kazakhstan from this point on.

==== Ottoman Empire ====
- 1514: Sultan Selim I defeats Safavids at the Battle of Chaldiran.
- 1516: Selim I defeats the Mamluks at the Battle of Merc-i Dabik and kills Sultan Kansu Gavri; Syria is conquered.
- 1517: The Ottoman army crosses the Sinai desert, defeats the new Mamluk Sultan Tomanbai at the Battle of Ridaniye and Battle of Cairo and conquers Egypt. The Sharif of Mecca presented keys to the holy cities of Mecca and Medina to Selim I and is declared their hereditary ruler. Al-Mutawakkil, the last Abbasid caliph, formally surrenders the title of caliph to Selim I.

=== 1520–1529 ===
==== Kazakh Khanate ====
- 1520: Qasim bin Janibek Khan creates the "Bright Road of Qasim Khan", which served as the first code of laws for the Kazakhs.
- 1521: Qasim bin Janibek Khan dies and is succeeded by his son Khanzada Muhammed, who assumes the title Muhammed Khan as the fifth ruler of the Kazakh Khanate.
- 1523: Kazakh ruler Muhammed Khan dies and is succeeded by his cousin Tahir Khan, the sixth ruler of the Kazakh Khanate.

==== South East Asia (Indonesia) ====
- 1527: Fall of Majapahit empire, the last Hindu stronghold in South East Asia. Demak established as first Islamic sultanate of Java.

==== Ottoman Empire ====
- 1520: Selim I dies and the reign of Suleiman I the Magnificent begins.
- 1521: Suleiman I conquers Belgrade.
- 1522: Suleiman I defeats the Knights Hospitaller and drives them from the island of Rhodes.
- 1526: Suleiman I defeats the Hungarian army at the Battle of Mohács, where Louis II of Hungary dies. Buda and Pest are taken by the Ottomans and Hungary is declared a vassal state of the Ottoman Empire.
- 1529: Unsuccessful Ottoman siege of Vienna.

==== Mughal Empire ====
- 1526: Babur destroys the Delhi Sultanate at the Battle of Panipat, laying the foundation of the Mughal Empire.
- 1527: Babur annihilates the Rajput Confederacy of Rana Sanga at the Battle of Khanwa, ending the most dangerous threat to Muslim rule in India at the time.
- 1528: Babur defeats an Afghan army at the Battle of Kannauj.
- 1529: Babur crushes an Afghan army at the Battle of Ghaghra, ending hopes of a Lodhi restoration.

=== 1530–1539 ===
==== Kazakh Khanate ====
- 1530: the First Kazakh Civil War is underway due to the inefficiency of Tahir Khan.
- 1533: Tahir Khan dies and is quickly succeeded by Ahmed Khan, the 7th ruler of the Kazakh Khanate.
- 1534: Some nobles dissent in rebellion from Ahmed Khan, refusing to recognize his legitimacy and further prolonging the civil war.
- 1536: Ahmed Khan dies and is succeeded by Haqnazar Khan.
- 1538: Haqnazar Khan ends the First Kazakh Civil War and re-consolidates all major Kazakh towns under his rule.

==== Ottoman Empire ====
- 1534: Suleiman I conducts a military campaign against Safavid Shah Tahmasp and conquers Van, Baghdad, and Tabriz.
- 1538: The Ottoman navy under the command of Barbarossa Khayreddin wins a naval victory against a combined Christian fleet at the Battle of Preveza.

==== Algeria ====
- 1533: Barbarossa Khayreddin is appointed the admiral of the Ottoman fleet and governor of Algeria.

=== 1550–1559 ===
==== Ottoman Empire ====
- 1550: The architect Mimar Sinan builds the Suleiman Mosque in Istanbul. The rise of the Muslim kingdom of Aceh in Sumatra.

==== Khanate of Kazan ====
- 1552: The Khanate is conquered by the Tsardom of Russia.

==== Indonesia ====
- 1550: Islam spreads to Java, the Maluku Islands, and Borneo.

==== Mughals ====
- 1556: Akbar begins his reign of the Mughal Empire in India at age 13 with his regent Bairam Khan after winning the Second Battle of Panipat against Hemu.

=== 1560–1569 ===
==== Ottoman Empire ====
- 1565: The Ottomans are defeated by the Knights Hospitaller during the Siege of Malta.
- 1566: The Ottomans gain control of the Aegean islands.
- 1566: Suleiman I dies and is succeeded by Selim II.

==== Spain ====
- 1568: Moriscos revolt during the Alpujarra uprising.

=== 1570–1579 ===
==== Ottoman Empire ====
- 1571: The Ottomans are defeated at the naval Battle of Lepanto.

==== Morocco ====
- 1578: The Battle of Alcazarquivir at Alcazarquivir in Morocco. King Sebastian of Portugal is killed.

=== 1580–1589 ===
==== Safavids ====
- 1587: The reign of Abbas I begins.

=== 1590–1599 ===
==== Religious ====
- 1591: Mustaali Ismailis split into Sulaymanis and Daudis.

== See also ==
- Timeline of Muslim history
