= Timeline of the history of Islam (11th century) =

Timeline of the history of Islam: 6th | 7th | 8th | 9th | 10th | 11th | 12th | 13th | 14th | 15th | 16th | 17th | 18th | 19th | 20th | 21st century

== 11th century (1001–1100 CE / 391–494 AH) ==
- 998–1030: Mahmud of Ghazni persuades mass conversions to Islam in present-day Afghanistan. Many Hindus and Buddhists are persuade in various ways into converting under his rule.
- 1001: Mahmud of Ghazni defeats the Hindu Shahis at Peshawar.
- 1004: Mahmud of Ghazni captures Bhatiya.
- 1005: Mahmud of Ghazni captures Multan and Ghur.
- 1008: Mahmud of Ghazni defeats the Rajput confederacy.
- 1010: Abdication of Hisham II in Spain. Accession of Muhammad II.
- 1011: In Spain Muhammad II is overthrown by Sulaiman II.
- 1012: In Spain, power is captured by Bani Hamud. Death of the Buwayhid Baha' al-Dawla, accession of Sultan al-Dawla.
- 1013: Berber Muslims massacre and pillage the inhabitants of Cordoba, including a large number of Jews. It is said that 2000 of them were killed.
- 1016: Death of the Zirid ruler Nasir al-Dawla Badis; accession of Al Muizz.
- 1018: In Spain, power is captured by Abd-ar-Rahman IV.
- 1019: Conshest of the Punjab by Mahmud of Ghazni.
- 1020: The Buwayhid Sultan al-Dawla is overthrown by Musharrif al-Dawla. Death of the Fatimid Caliph Al Hakim, accession of Ali az-Zahir.
- 1024: In Spain, assassination of Abd-ar-Rahman V.
- 1025: Death of the Buwayhid Musharrif al-Dawla, accession of Jalal al-Dawla. Mahmud of Ghazni raids Gujarat, plundering the Somnath temple and breaking its jyotirlinga. He takes away a booty of 2 million dinars.
- 1029: In Spain, death of Mustaft, accession of Hisham III.
- 1030: Death of Mahmud of Ghazni.
- 1031: In Spain, deposition of Hisham III, and end of the Umayyad Caliphate of Córdoba. Death of the Abbasid Caliph al-Qadir, accession of al-Qa'im.
- 1033: In a pogrom in Fez, Morocco, Berber Muslims kill more than 6000 Jews and take away their women and belongings.
- 1035: Under attacks by King War Jabi, his Almoravid allies and many other African Muslims, the Serer community in West Africa faces pressure to embrace Islam. This Islamization goes on for centuries. An unknown number of them die in these jihads but many of them scatter. By 1867, most of the jihads are over.
- 1036: Death of the Fatimid Caliph Ali az-Zahir, accession of Ma'ad al-Mustansir Billah. Toghrül is crowned as the king of the Seljuqs.
- 1037: Seljuq Turks under Tuğrul Bey sack the city of Ghazni.
- 1040: Battle of Dandanaqan, the Seljuqs defeat the Ghazanavids. Deposition of Mas'ud I of Ghazni Sultan, accession of Mohammad Ghaznavi. Al Moravids come to power in North Africa.
- 1041: The Ghaznavid Sultan Mohammad Ghaznavi is overthrown by Maw'dud Ghaznavi.
- 1044: Death of the Buwayhid Jalal al-Dawla, accession of Abu Kalijar.
- 1046: Basasiri captures power in Baghdad.
- 1047: The Zirids in North Africa repudiate allegiance to the Fatimid and transfer allegiance to the Abbasids.
- 1048: Death of the Buwayhid Abu Kalijar, accession of Malik al-Rahim.
- 1050: Yusuf ibn Tashfin comes to power in the Maghrib.
- 1055: Tuğrul Bey overthrows the Buwayhids.
- 1057: Basasiri recaptures power in Baghdad, deposes Al-Qa'im and offers allegiance to the Fatimid Caliph.
- 1059: Tuğrul Bey recaptures power in Baghdad, Al-Qa'im is restored as the Caliph.
- 1060: Ibrahim of Ghazna becomes the Sultan. Yusuf ibn Tashfin founds the city of Marrakesh. The Zirids abandon their capital Ashir and establish their capital at Bougie.
- 1062: Death of the Zirid ruler Al Muizz, accession of Tamin.
- 1063: Death of the Seljuq Sultan Tuğrul Bey accession of Alp Arslan.
- 1064: Seljuk army under Alp Arslan captured Ani and slaughtered its population.
- 1065: The Fatimid governor of Ramla rescues the Great German Pilgrimage which had come under attack by local Bedouin bandits.
- 1071: Battle of Manzikert, the Byzantine emperor Romanos IV is taken captive by the Seljuq Turks.
- 1073: Death of Alp Arslan, accession of Malik Shah. Badr al-Jamali takes power as the vizier of the Fatimid Caliphate.
- 1077: Death of the Abbasid Caliph Al-Qa'im, accession of Al-Muqtadi.
- 1077: Seljuq Turks found Sultanate of Rûm in Turkey.
- 1082: The Almoravids conquer Algeria.
- 1085: After a four-year siege, Toledo delivers itself up to Alfonso VI.
- 1086: Battle of Zallakha. The Almoravids defeat the Christians in Spain.
- 1086: Death of Suleyman I of Rum, accession of Kilij Arslan I.
- 1090: Hassan-i Sabbah captures Alamut, making it an Isma'ilite stronghold.
- 1091: The Normans conquer the island of Sicily; end of the Muslim rule.
- 1092: Death of the Seljuq Sultan Malik Shah I, accession of Mahmud I of Great Seljuq.
- 1094: Death of Seljuq Sultan Mahmud I; accession of Barkiyaruq. Death of the Abbasid Caliph Al-Muqtadi, accession of Mustahzir.
- 1095: The First Crusade.
- 1097: Kilij Arslan I loses his capital of Nicea and the battle of Dorylaeum.
- 1099: The crusaders capture Jerusalem. By the end of this century, global Muslim population had grown to 5 per cent of the total.

== See also ==
Timeline of Muslim history
