= Timeline of the history of Islam (13th century) =

Timeline of the history of Islam: 6th | 7th | 8th | 9th | 10th | 11th | 12th | 13th | 14th | 15th | 16th | 17th | 18th | 19th | 20th | 21st century

- 1202: Bakhtiyar Khalji conquers large parts of Bengal.
- 1203: Ghurid ruler Ghiyath al-Din Muhammad died of illness in Herat on 13 March 1203, succeeded by his younger brother Muizzuddin Muhammad Ghori.
- 1204: Muizzuddin Ghori suffered a reverse near the Oxus river in Battle of Andhkhud against the Khwarazmian ruler Ala ad-Din Muhammad II aided by contingent of Qara Khitai.
- 1206: Muizzuddin Ghori assassinated by sect of rival Muslims near Indus. Qutbu l-Din Aibak laid the foundation of Delhi Sultanate in north Indian plain.
- 1210: Assassination of the Ghurid Sultan Mahmud, accession of Sam. Death of Qutb ud Din Aibak, accession of Aram Shah in India.
- 1211: End of the Ghurid rule, their territories annexed by the Khawarzam Shahs. In India Aram Shah overthrown by Iltutmish.
- 1212: Battle of Las Navas de Tolosa in Spain, end of the Almohad rule in Spain. The Almohads suffer defeat by the Christians in Spain at the Las Navas de Tolosa. The Almohad Sultan Muhammad an-Nasir escapes to Morocco.
- 1213 Almohad Sultan Muhammad an-Nasir's death. Accession of his son Yusuf II, Almohad Caliph.
- 1216: The Marinids under their leader Abdul Haq occupy north eastern part of Morocco. The Almohad suffer defeat by the Marinids at the Battle of Nakur.
- 1217: The Marinids suffer defeat in the battle fought on the banks of the Sibu river. Abdul Haq is killed and the Marinids evacuate Morocco.
- 1218: Death of the Ayyubid ruler Al-Adil I, accession of Al-Kamil. The Marinids return to Morocco under their leader Othman and occupy Fez.
- 1220: Death of the Khwarezmid Shah Muhammad II of Khwarezm, accession of Jalal al-Din Mangburni.
- 1223: Death of the Almohad ruler Yusuf II, Almohad Caliph, accession of Abdul-Wahid I, Almohad Caliph. In Spain a brother of Yusuf II, Almohad Caliph declares his independence and assumes the title of Al Adil (Abdallah, Almohad Caliph).
- 1224: Death of the Almohad ruler Abd al-Wahid I, accession of Abdallah, Almohad Caliph.
- 1225: Death of the Abbasid Caliph An-Nasir, accession of Az-Zahir.
- 1227: Assassination of the Almohad ruler Abdullah Adil, accession of his son, Yahya.
- 1229: Death of the Almohad ruler Yahya, accession of Idris I. The Ayyubid Al-Kamil restores Jerusalem to the Christians.
- 1230: End of the Khwarezmid Empire.
- 1232: Death of the Almohad ruler Idris I, accession, of Abdul Wahid II.
- 1234: Death of the Ayyubid ruler Al-Kamil, accession of Al-Adil II.
- 1236: Death of Delhi Sultan Altamash. Accession of Rukn ud din Firuz.
- 1237: Accession of Razia Sultan as Delhi Sultan.
- 1240: Death of Razia Sultan, accession of Muiz ud din Bahram.
- 1242: Death of Muiz ud din Bahram, accession of Ala ud din Masud as Delhi Sultan. Death of the Almohad ruler Abd al-Wahid II, accession of Abu al-Hasan as-Said al-Mutadid. Death of the Abbasid Caliph Al-Mustansir, accession of Al-Musta'sim.
- 1244: The Almohad defeat the Marinids at the battle of Abu Bayash. The Marinids evacuate Morocco.
- 1245: The Muslims reconquer Jerusalem.
- 1246: Death of the Delhi Sultan Ala ud din Masud, accession of Nasiruddin Mahmud.
- 1248: Death of the Almohad ruler Abu al-Hasan as-Said al-Mutadid, ambushed in an attack to Tlemcen. Accession of Umar, Almohad Caliph.
- 1250: The Marinids return to Morocco, and occupy a greater part thereof.
- 1258: Battle of Baghdad (1258) - The Mongols sack Baghdad. Death of the Abbasid Caliph Al-Musta'sim. End of the Abbasid rule. The Mongols under Hulagu Khan establish their rule in Iran and Iraq. Berke Khan, the Muslim chief of the Golden Horde, protests against the treatment meted out to the Abbasid Caliph and withdraws his contingent from Baghdad.
- 1259: the Hafsid ruler Abd Allah Muhammad declares himself as the Caliph and assumes the name of Al Mustansir.
- 1260: Battle of Ayn Jalut in Syria. The Mongols are defeated by the Mamluks of Egypt, and the spell of the invincibility of the Mongols is broken. Baibars becomes the Mamluk Sultan.
- 1262: Death of Baha-ud-din Zakariya in Multan who is credited with the introduction of the Suhrawardiyya Sufi order in the South Asia.
- 1265: Death of Hulagu Khan. Death of Fariduddin Ganjshakar the Chishti saint of the South Asia.
- 1266: Death of Berke Khan, the first ruler of the Golden Horde to be converted to Islam. The Eighth Crusade: the crusaders invade Tunisia; failure of the crusade.
- 1267: Malik ul Salih establishes the first Muslim state of Samudra Pasai in Indonesia. Umar, Almohad Caliph seeks the help of the Christians, and the Spaniards invade Morocco. The Marinids drive away the Spaniards from Morocco. Assassination of Umar, Almohad Caliph; accession of Idris II, Almohad Caliph.
- 1269: Idris II, Almohad Caliph is overthrown by the Marinids, End of the Almohad. The Marinids come to power in Morocco under Abu Yaqub.
- 1270: Death of Mansa Wali the founder of the Muslim rule in Mali.
- 1272: Death of Muhammad I of Granada the founder of the Emirate of Granada. Yaghmurason invades Morocco but meets a reverse at the battle
- 1273: Death of Jalal al-Din Muhammad Rumi.
- 1274: Death of Nasir al-Din Tusi. The Marinids wrest Sijilmasa from the Ziyyanids. Ninth Crusade under Edward I of England. The crusade ends in fiasco and Edward returns to England.
- 1277: Death of Baibars.
- 1280: Battle of Hims.
- 1283: Death of Yaghmurasan. Accession of his son Othman.
- 1285: Tunisia splits in Tunis and Bougie.
- 1286: Death of Ghiyas ud din Balban. Death of Abu Yusuf Yaqub. Bughra Khan declares his independence in Bengal under the name of Nasiruddin.
- 1290: End of the slave dynasty in India Jalal ud din Firuz Khalji comes into power. Othman embarks on a career of conquest and, by 1290, most of the Central Maghreb is conquered by the Ziyyanids.
- 1291: Death of Iranian poet Saadi.
- 1296: Alauddin Khalji ascended the throne of Delhi.

Mongol ruler Ghazan Khan converted to Islam.

- 1299: Mongols invade Syria. The Marinids besiege Tlemcen, the capital of the Ziyyanid Kingdom of Tlemcen. By the end of this century, global Muslim population had grown to 7 per cent of the total.

== See also ==
- Timeline of Muslim history
