= Timeline of the history of Islam =

History

Timeline of the history of Islam: 6th | 7th | 8th | 9th | 10th | 11th | 12th | 13th | 14th | 15th | 16th | 17th | 18th | 19th | 20th | 21st century

This timeline of Islamic history relates the Gregorian and Islamic calendars in the history of Islam. This timeline starts with the lifetime of Muhammad, which is believed by non-Muslims to be when Islam started, though not by Muslims.

== Broad periods (Gregorian and Islamic dates) ==
Muhammad and the Rashidun Caliphs

- 6th century CE (23 BH – 13 BH)

Timeline of early Islamic history, the Umayyad Caliphate, the Abbasid Caliphate and its fragmentation, the Mamluk Sultanate, the Delhi Sultanate

- 7th century CE (23 BH – 81 AH)
- 8th century CE (81 AH – 184 AH)
- 9th century CE (184 AH – 288 AH)
- 10th century CE (288 AH – 391 AH)
- 11th century CE (391 AH – 494 AH)
- 12th century CE (494 AH – 597 AH)
- 13th century CE (597 AH – 700 AH)
- 14th century CE (700 AH – 803 AH)

Regional empires and dynasties (Ottoman Empire, Safavid Empire, Mughal Empire)

- 15th century CE (803 AH – 906 AH)
- 16th century CE (906 AH – 1009 AH)
- 17th century CE (1009 AH – 1112 AH)
- 18th century CE (1112 AH – 1215 AH)
- 19th century CE (1215 AH – 1318 AH)

Final period of colonialism and time of postcolonial nation-states

- 20th century CE (1318 AH – 1421 AH)
- 21st century CE (1421 AH – present)

== Islamic centuries to Gregorian ==
Islamic centuries to corresponding Gregorian years

- 1st century AH (622 – 719 CE)
- 2nd century AH (719 – 816)
- 3rd century AH (816 – 913)
- 4th century AH (913 – 1009)
- 5th century AH (1009 – 1106)
- 6th century AH (1106 – 1203)
- 7th century AH (1203 – 1299)
- 8th century AH (1299 – 1397)
- 9th century AH (1397 – 1495)
- 10th century AH (1495 – 1591)
- 11th century AH (1591 – 1688)
- 12th century AH (1688 – 1785)
- 13th century AH (1785 – 1883)
- 14th century AH (1883 – 1980)
- 15th century AH (1980 – 2077)

== See also ==
- Glossary of Islam
- Outline of Islam
- Index of Islam-related articles
- Timeline of science and engineering in the Muslim world
- History of Islam
- Timeline of Jerusalem
