= Timeline of the history of Islam (19th century) =

Timeline of the history of Islam: 6th | 7th | 8th | 9th | 10th | 11th | 12th | 13th | 14th | 15th | 16th | 17th | 18th | 19th | 20th | 21st century

== 19th century (1801–1900) (1215 AH – 1318 AH) ==
- 1803: Sheikh Abdul Aziz bin Muhammad bin Saud assassinated. Shah Shuja proclaimed King of Afghanistan.
- 1804: Uprising under George Petrovich against Janissary garrison at Belgrade marked beginning of Serbian Revolution.
- 1804: Othman dan Fodio established Islamic State of Sokoto in Northern Nigeria.
- 1805: Saud bin Abdul Aziz captured Medina defeating the Ottoman Empire garrison.
- 1805: Faraizi movement launched in Bengal.
- 1805: Sultan Selim III yields to the demand that Muhammad Ali be appointed wāli of Egypt.
- 1806: Khanate of Khiva came into limelight under the rule of Mohammed Rahim Khan.
- 1807: Selim III deposed by Janissaries.
- 1807: Darqawi sect revolted against Turkish domination.
- 1807: Tunisia repudiated suzerainty of Algeria.
- 1808: Bairakdar, the ayan of Rusçuk, having arrived in Constantinople too late to restore Selim III (who had been strangled), installed Mahmud II, the sole surviving member of the Ottoman line.
- 1811: Birth of Siyyid Mírzá 'Alí-Muhammad known as the Báb, founder of Bábí movement. British occupied Indonesia.
- 1811: Muhammad Ali has Mamluks massacred in the Citadel of Cairo, thereby consolidating his absolute power.
- 1812: Medina fell to Egyptians.
- 1812: Treaty of Bucharest between Ottoman Empire and Russia end a war of 6 years
- 1813: Mecca and Taif captured by Egyptian forces and Saudis expelled from Hejaz.
- 1814: Iran executed treaty of alliance with the British known as the Definitive Treaty.
- 1814: Death of Saud bin Abdul Aziz.
- 1814 Bey Othman of Tunisia assassinated by his cousin Mahmud ibn Muhammad.
- 1816: British withdrew from Indonesia restoring it to the Dutch.
- 1817: Sir Syed Ahmad Khan born.
- 1818: Conclusion of Egypt's seven-year campaign against the Wahabis in Arabia, who had occupied Mecca and Medina and threatened Syria. As a result, the eastern coast of the Mediterranean fell under Egyptian control.
- 1821: Alexander Ypsilantis led Greek insurgents across the river Prut into Danubian Principalities on March 6 (n.s.) to begin the Greek War of Independence against the Ottoman Empire.
- 1822: Death of Maulay Ismail in Morocco.
- 1822: Greek assembly at Epidauros declared Greek independence and drew up an organic statute establishing a parliament and executive directory.
- 1826: Janissaries massacred by forces loyal to Mahmud II after they revolted following formation of new army corps.
- 1827: Malaya became a preserve of the British according to Anglo-Netherland treaty in 1824.
- 1828: Russia declared war against Ottoman Empire.
- 1829: Treaty of Adrianople ends the Russo-Turkish War (1828–1829)
- 1830: French forces landed near Algiers and occupied Algeria ending 313 years rule of Turks.
- 1831: Syed Ahmad Barelvi and Shah Ismail leaders of Jihad movement in India fell fighting the Sikhs in Balakot.
- 1831: Sayyid Said, King of Oman, shifted his capital to Zanzibar.
- 1832: Turks defeated in the battle of Konya by Egyptian forces.
- 1833: At the urging of France, the Convention of Kütahya ended the war between Egypt and the Ottoman Empire and provided that the empire grant the sultan of Egypt all of Syria and Adana.
- 1833: The Treaty of Hünkâr İskelesi established alliance between the Ottoman Empire and Russia and provided that the Ottomans would close the Dardanelles to any foreign warships at the Russians' request.
- 1834: Abdul Qadir of Algeria recognized as ruler of the area under his control by the French.
- 1839: In response to threats by Egyptian wāli Muhammad Ali to declare himself independent, an Ottoman army began (March) the invasion of Syria from the Euphrates. It was defeated (June 24) by the Egyptians in the battle of Nezib. On July 1 the Turkish fleet surrendered itself (possibly by an act of treachery) to Muhammad Ali in Alexandria.
- 1839: The Hatt-ı Şerif of Gülhane (Supreme Edict of the Rose House) issued by sultan Abdülmecid I, which began the Tanzimât reforms of the Ottoman Empire.
- 1840: Quadruple Alliance by the European powers to force Egypt to relinquish Syria. British free occupied Aden.
- 1841: State of Adamawa established by Adams adjacent to Nigeria.
- 1842: Amir Abdul Qadir, ousted from Algeria by the French. He crossed over to Morocco. Shah Shuja assassinated ending the Durrani rule in Afghanistan.
- 1847: Amir Abdul Qadir surrendred to France under the condition of safe conduct to a Muslim country of his choice, but France violated its pledge and sent him as a captive to France.
- 1849: Death of Muhammad Ali of Egypt.
- 1850: The Báb is executed by the Persian government. Táhirih, a renowned poet and staunch advocate of Bábism also executed.
- 1852: Release of Amir Abdul Qadir by Napoleon III. He settled in Ottoman Empire.
- 1853: After a series of intrigues ostensibly designed to enable it to act as protector of Orthodox Christians in Ottoman territories failed, Russia occupied the Danubian Principalities of Moldavia and Wallachia in March. The Ottoman Empire declared war on Russia in October beginning the Crimean War. Great Britain and France would declare war on Russia the following March.
- 1856: Hatt-ı Hümâyûnu (the Reform Edict of 1856) is issued on February 18 and constitutes the most important Ottoman reform measure of the nineteenth century. It guaranteed the lives and property of Christians, replaced the heads of churches with a national synod, provided full freedom of conscience and civil participation for adherents to all religions. The edict was forced on the sultan by the British, French and Austrians to forestall a Russian intervention.
- 1856: Treaty of Paris (March 30) ends Crimean War, and admits Turkey into the European concert, whereby its independence and imperial integrity was guaranteed. Russia ceded the mouths of the Danube and Bessarabia, returned Kurs, relinquished its claim as protector of Christians in the Ottoman Empire and agreed to the neutralization of the Black Sea.
- 1857: British captured Delhi and eliminated Mughal rule in India after 332 years. Last Mughal Emperor Bahadur Shah Zafar was exiled to Rangoon in Burma. This was also the end of 1000 years of Muslim rule over India.
- 1858: Feudal holdings abolished in the Ottoman Empire.
- 1859: Imam Shamil laid down arms before Russian forces and the Islamic State of Dagestan became a Russian province.
- 1860: Maulay Muhammad defeated by Spain.
- 1860: Masjid-e-Abu Hurairah, established in Cardiff, is the first mosque in Britain.
- 1860: Civil War between Syrian Druzes and Marionite Christians erupted. Authorized by the European Powers, France sent expeditionary force which restored order by June 1861.
- 1861: Sultan Abd-ul-Mejid I died and is succeeded by Abdülaziz whose reign (1861-1876) is notable for the rapid spread of western influence (particularly Great Britain and France, allies of the Ottoman Empire during the Crimean War), as evidenced by the first foreign loans, railroad construction, and public debt administration, and the rise of secular liberalism, shown by literary revival, translation of Western literature, rise of Turkish journalism and establishment of universities.
- 1861: Overthrow of the Bambara Empire by the Toucouleur Empire.
- 1862: Faraizi movement fizzled out after the death of Dudu Miyan. Overthrow of the Massina Empire by the Toucouleur Empire.
- 1863: Banque Impériale Ottoamane established to function as Turkey's central bank.
- 1864: Circassian genocide
- 1865: Khanate of Kokand liquidated by Russia.
- 1869: Jamal al-Din al-Afghani exiled from Afghanistan. He proceeded to Egypt.
- 1871: Tunisia recognised suzerainty of Ottoman Empire through a firman.
- 1873: Emirate of Bukhara and Khanate of Khiva made protectorates by Russia.
- 1876: Britain purchased shares of Khediv Ismail in the Suez canal and got involved in Egyptian affairs.
- 1876: Constitutional monarchy in Ottoman Empire (Turkey)(first phase)
- 1878: Conference of Berlin. Ottoman Empire loses territories to Russia or Balkan countries
- 1878: Ottoman Empire handed over Cyprus to Britain.
- 1879: Jamal al-Din al-Afghani exiled from Egypt. Treaty of Berlin. Ottoman lost 4/5 th of its territory in Europe.
- 1881: France invaded Tunisia and the Bey acknowledged supremacy of France as a result of the treaty of Bardo. Muhammad Ahmad declared himself Mahdi in northern Sudan.
- 1882: Mirza Ghulam Ahmad of Qadian first claimed to be divinely appointed by God but did not take pledge until 1889.
- 1882: Egypt came under British military occupation.
- 1883: Death of Amir Abdul Qadir in Damascus.
- 1885: Muhammad Ahmad declared free Government of Sudan under his rule. Death of Mahdi Sudani five months after the occupation of Khartoum.
- 1889: Shah Jahan Mosque opened in Woking (England).
- 1889: Mirza Ghulam Ahmad of Qadian claimed to be the Promised Messiah and Imam Mahdi, laid the foundation of the Ahmadiyya Movement. But majority of Muslims denounced Mirza Ghulam Ahmad as a Heretic and later Parliament of Pakistan declared followers of the Ahmadiyya Movement in Islam as Non-Muslims.
- 1890: End of the Toucouleur Empire.
- 1895: Afghanistan got Wakhan Corridor by an understanding with Russia and British India making Afghan border touch China.
- 1897: Sultanate of Bagirmi occupied by the French.
- 1899: Fall of Muhammad Ahmad's Mahdi State occupied by the British and the Egyptians jointly. By the end of this century, global Muslim population had grown to 13 percent of the total.

== See also ==
- Timeline of Muslim history
