= Timeline of the history of Islam (17th century) =

Timeline of the history of Islam: 6th | 7th | 8th | 9th | 10th | 11th | 12th | 13th | 14th | 15th | 16th | 17th | 18th | 19th | 20th | 21st century

== 17th century (1601–1700) (1009 AH – 1112 AH) ==
- 1601: Khandesh annexed by the Mughals.
- 1604: Battle of Urmia; the Ottoman Empire suffers defeat. Safavid Iran recaptures Tabriz, Mesopotamia. Mosul and Diyarbekr. Death of Mehmed III, accession of Ahmed I; see Sultans of the Ottoman Empire .
- 1604: In Dutch Indonesia, death of Alauddin Rayat Shah, Sultan of Acheh, accession of Ali Rayat Shah III.
- 1605: Death of the Mughal emperor Jalal-ud-Din Akbar; accession of Jahangir.
- 1607: Annexation of Ahmadnagar by the Mughals.
- 1609: Annexation of Bidar by the Mughals.
- 1611: Kuch Behar subjugated by the Mughals.
- 1612: Kamrup annexed by the Mughals.
- 1617: Death of Ahmed I; accession of Mustafa I; see Sultans of the Ottoman Empire. British East India Company begins trading with Mughal India.
- 1618: Tipperah annexed by the Mughals.
- 1620: In Ottoman Empire, deposition of Mustafa; accession of Osman II, see Sultans of the Ottoman Empire.
- 1623: In Ottoman Empire, Mustafa recaptured power.
- 1625: In Ottoman Empire, deposition of Mustafa, accession of Murad IV, see Sultan of the Ottoman Empire.
- 1627: Death of the Mughal emperor Jahangir; accession of Shah Jahan.
- 1629: Death of Safavid Shah Abbas I; accession of grandson Shah Safi.
- 1631: Death of Mumtaz Mahal, wife of Mughal Emperor Shah Jahan and the lady of Taj Mahal, Agra.
- 1635: Military campaign of Ottoman Sultan Murad IV against Iran and conquest of Erivan castle. Conquest of the castles of Maku, Hoy and Tabriz and destruction of their walls.
- 1637: Death of Iskandar Muda in Indonesia; accession of Iskandar II.
- 1638: In Ottoman, military campaign of Sultan Murad IV against Iran and conquest of Baghdad after a siege.
- 1640: Death of Ottoman Sultan Murad IV, accession of his brother Ibrahim I, see Sultans of the Ottoman Empire.
- 1641: Ottoman vassal state of Khanate of Crimea capture Azov. In Indonesia, death of Iskandar II; accession of the Queen Tajul Alam.
- 1642: In Persia, death of Shah Safi, accession of Shah Abbas II.
- 1645: Start of the long-lasting Ottoman-Venetian War for the island of Crete by the landing of the Ottoman forces there and the conquest of the castle of Khania.
- 1648: In Ottoman Empire, Ibrahim I deposed; accession of Mehmed IV; see Sultans of the Ottoman Empire.
- 1656: In Ottoman Empire Mehmed Kuiprilli appointed the Grand Vizier with special powers.
- 1658: Deposition of the Mughal emperor Shah Jahan, accession of Aurangzeb.
- 1661: Death of Grand Vizier of Ottomans Mehmed Kuiprilli and appointment as the Grand Vizier of his son Ahmed Kuiprilli.
- 1667: Death of Shah Abbas II; accession of Shah Suleiman.
- 1668: Conquest of the castle of Candia by the Ottomans concludes the long-lasting Ottoman-Venetian War on the island of Crete.
- 1673: The Badshahi Masjid was constructed by Aurangzeb in Lahore, Pakistan.
- 1675: Execution of the Sikh Guru Tegh Bahadur. In Indonesia death of the queen Tajul Alam, accession of the queen Nur ul Alam.
- 1676: Death of the Grand Vizier of Ottomans Ahmad Kuiprilli, appointment of Kara Mustafa.
- 1678: In Indonesia, death of the queen Nur ul Alam, accession of the queen Inayat Zakia.
- 1680: Death of Marhatta chieftain Shivaji.
- 1682: Assam annexed by the Mughals. Aurangzeb shifts the capital to Aurangabad in the Deccan.
- 1683: The Ottomans put Vienna under siege and are defeated in the Battle of Vienna, marking the end of the Turkish advance into Europe. Grand Vizier Kara Mustafa is executed for the failure of the expedition.
- 1686: Annexation of Bijapur by the Mughals.
- 1687: Kingdom of Golkonda annexed by the Mughals. Defeat of the Ottomans by Austria at Second Battle of Mohács. Deposition of Mehmed IV; accession of Suleiman II; see Sultans of the Ottoman Empire
- 1688: In Indonesia, death of Queen Inayat Zakia, accession of the queen Kamalah.
- 1691: Death of the Ottoman Sultan Suleiman II; accession of Ahmed II, see Sultans of the Ottoman Empire.
- 1692: Death of the Ottoman Sultan Ahmed II; accession of Mustafa II; see Sultans of the Ottoman Empire.
- 1694: In Persia, death of Shah Suleiman, accession of Soltan Hoseyn.
- 1699: In Indonesia death of Queen Kamalah.
- 1700: Murshid Quli Khan declares the independence of Bengal and establishes his capital at Murshidabad. By the end of this century, global Muslim population had grown to 11 per cent of the total.

== See also ==
- Timeline of Muslim history
