= Timeline of the history of Islam (10th century) =

Timeline of the history of Islam: 6th | 7th | 8th | 9th | 10th | 11th | 12th | 13th | 14th | 15th | 16th | 17th | 18th | 19th | 20th | 21st century

== 10th century (901–1000 CE / 288–391 AH) ==
- 902: Death of the Abbasid Caliph al-Mu'tadid; al-Muktafi becomes Caliph. Death of the Saffarid ruler Amr bin Laith. Fall of Taormina signals the completion of the Muslim conquest of Sicily.
- 903: Assassination of the Qarmatian ruler Abu-Sa'id Jannabi; accession of Abu Tahir al-Jannabi.
- 905: Abdallah bin Hamdan founds the Hamdanid rule in Mosul and Jazira. End of the Tulunid rule in Egypt.
- 908: Death of the Abbasid Caliph Muktafi; accession of al-Muqtadir. End of the Saffarid rule, annexation of their territories by the Samanids.
- 909: Sa'id ibn Husayn, with the help of his chief missionary-commander Abu Abdallah al-Shi'i overthrows the Aghlabids and founds the Fatimid rule in North Africa at which time he changes his title to Imam Abd Allah al-Mahdi Billah. The Aghlabid Ziyadat Allah is thus expelled from the region, and with him the final remnants of Sunni Muslim rule in North Africa.
- 912: Death of the Umayyad ruler Abdallah ibn Muhammad in Spain, accession of Abd al-Rahman III.
- 913: Assassination of the Samanid ruler Ahmad, accession of Nasr II.
- 927: Invasion of Iraq by the Qarmatians under Abu Tahir.
- 928: Mardavij ibn Ziyar founds the Ziyarid rule in Tabaristan.
- 930: Sack of Mecca by the Qarmatian ruler Abu Tahir al-Jannabi. Th Qarmatians carry away the Black Stone from the Kaaba. In Spain, Abd al-Rahman III declares himself Caliph of Córdoba.
- 931: Deposition and restoration of the Abbasid Caliph al-Muqtadir.
- 932: Death of the Abbasid Caliph Muqtadir; accession of al-Qahir.
- 932 : Saltuk Buğra Khan of Karahan Turks embraced Islam.
- 934: Deposition of the Abbasid Caliph al-Qahir; accession of ar-Radi. Death of the Fatimid Caliph Ubaidullah; accession of al Qaim; Imad al-Dawla establishes Buwayhid power in Fars.
- 935: Rukn al-Dawla conquers Ray and establishes the Buwayhid government there. Assassination of the Ziyarid ruler Mardavij; accession of Vushmgir. Death of Hamdanid ruler Abdallah ibn Hamdan, accession of Nasir al-Dawla.
- 936: By coup, Ibn Raiq becomes the Amir al-Umara under Abbasid Caliph ar-Radi.
- 938: By another coup, power at Baghdad is captured by Bajkam.
- 940: Death of the Abbasid Caliph ar-Radi, accession of al-Muttaqi.
- 941: Death of Bajkam, capture of power by Kurtakin.
- 942: Ibn Raiq recaptures power in Baghdad.
- 943: Abu Abdallah al-Baridi captures power. The Abbasid Caliph al-Muttaqi is forced to seek refuge with the Hamdanids. Nasir al-Dawla captures power at Baghdad and the Caliph returns to Baghdad. Power is captured by Tuzun and Nasir al-Dawla retires to Mosul. Death of the Samanid ruler Nasr II, accession of Nuh I.
- 944: al-Muttaqi is blinded and deposed, accession of al-Mustakfi. Abu Tahir al-Jannabi dies.
- 945: Death of Tuzun. Shirzad becomes Amir al-Umara. Mu'izz al-Dawla captures power and establishes the Buwayhid dynasty in Iraq. Deposition of the Abbasid Caliph al-Mustakfi, accession of al-Muti.
- 946: Death of the Fatimid Caliph Al-Qaim. Accession of Mansur. Death of the Ikhshidid ruler Muhammad bin Tughj, accession of Abu'l-Qasim Unujur ibn al-Ikhshid. Sayf al-Dawla establishes himself at Aleppo
- 949: Death of the Buwayhid shah of Fars, 'Imad al-Dawla. Accession of 'Adud al-Dawla.
- 951: The Qarmatians restore the Black Stone to the Kaaba.
- 954: Death of the Samanid ruler Nuh I, accession of 'Abd al-Malik I.
- 961: Death of the Samanid ruler 'Abd al-Malik I, accession of Mansur I.
- 961: Turkic mameluk Alptigin founds the rule of the Ghazanavids.
- 961: Death of the Umayyad Caliph Abd al-Rahman III in Spain; accession of al-Hakam II. Death of the Ikhshidid ruler Unujur, accession of Abu'l-Hasan Ali ibn al-Ikhshid.
- 965: Death of the Qarmatian ruler Abu Mansur; accession of Hasan Azam. Assassination of the Ikhshidid ruler Abu'l-Hasan Ali ibn al-Ikhshid; power captured by Abu al-Misk Kafur. Fall of Tarsus to the Byzantines.
- 967: Death of the Buwayhid Sultan Mu'izz al-Dawla, accession of 'Izz al-Dawla. Death of the Hamdanid ruler Sayf al-Dawla.
- 968: Death of the Ikhshidid ruler Abu al-Misk Kafur; accession of Abu'l-Fawaris Ahmad ibn Ali.
- 969: Byzantines occupy Antioch and force Aleppo to become a protectorate. The Fatimids conquer Egypt.
- 972: Buluggin ibn Ziri founds the rule of the Zirids in Algeria.
- 973: Shi'a–Sunni disturbances in Baghdad; power captured in Baghdad by the Turkish General Sabuktigin.
- 974: Abdication of the Abbasid Caliph al-Muti; accession of at-Ta'i.
- 975: Death of the Fatimid Caliph al-Muizz, accession of Al-Aziz Billah.
- 976: The Buwayhid Sultan 'Izz al-Dawla recaptures power with the help of his cousin 'Adud al-Dawla. Death of the Samanid ruler Mansur I, accession of Nuh II. In Spain death of the Umayyad Caliph al-Hakam II, accession of Hisham II.
- 977: Sabuktigin becomes the amir of Ghaznavids.
- 978: Death of the Buwayhid Sultan 'Izz al-Dawla, power captured by 'Adud al-Dawla who ruled former in Fars. The Hamdanids of Aleppo overthrown by the Buwayhids.
- 981: End of the Qarmatian rule at Bahrain.
- 983: Death of the Buwayhid Sultan Adud al-Dawla; accession of Samsam al-Dawla.
- 984: Death of the Zirid dynasty ruler Buluggin, accession of al-Mansur ibn Buluggin.
- 986: The Buwayhid Sultan Samsam al-Dawla overthrown by Sharaf al-Dawla.
- 989: Death of the Buwayhid Sultan Sharaf al-Dawla, accession of Baha al-Dawla.
- 991: Deposition of the Abbasid Caliph at-Ta'i, accession of al-Qadir.
- 996: Death of the Zirid dynasty ruler Mansur, accession of Badis ibn Mansur.
- 996: Death of the Fatimid Caliph Al-Aziz Billah, accession of Al-Hakim.
- 997: Death of the Samanid ruler Nuh II, accession of Mansur II.
- 998: Death of the Samanid ruler Mansur II, accession of 'Abd al-Malik II. Mahmud of Ghaznavid becomes the Amir of Ghazni.
- 999: Bughra Khan of Karahan Turks capture Bukhara. End of the Samanids.
- 999: By the end of this century, global Muslim population was estimated at 10 million.

== See also ==
- Timeline of Muslim history
