= Timeline of the history of Islam (21st century) =

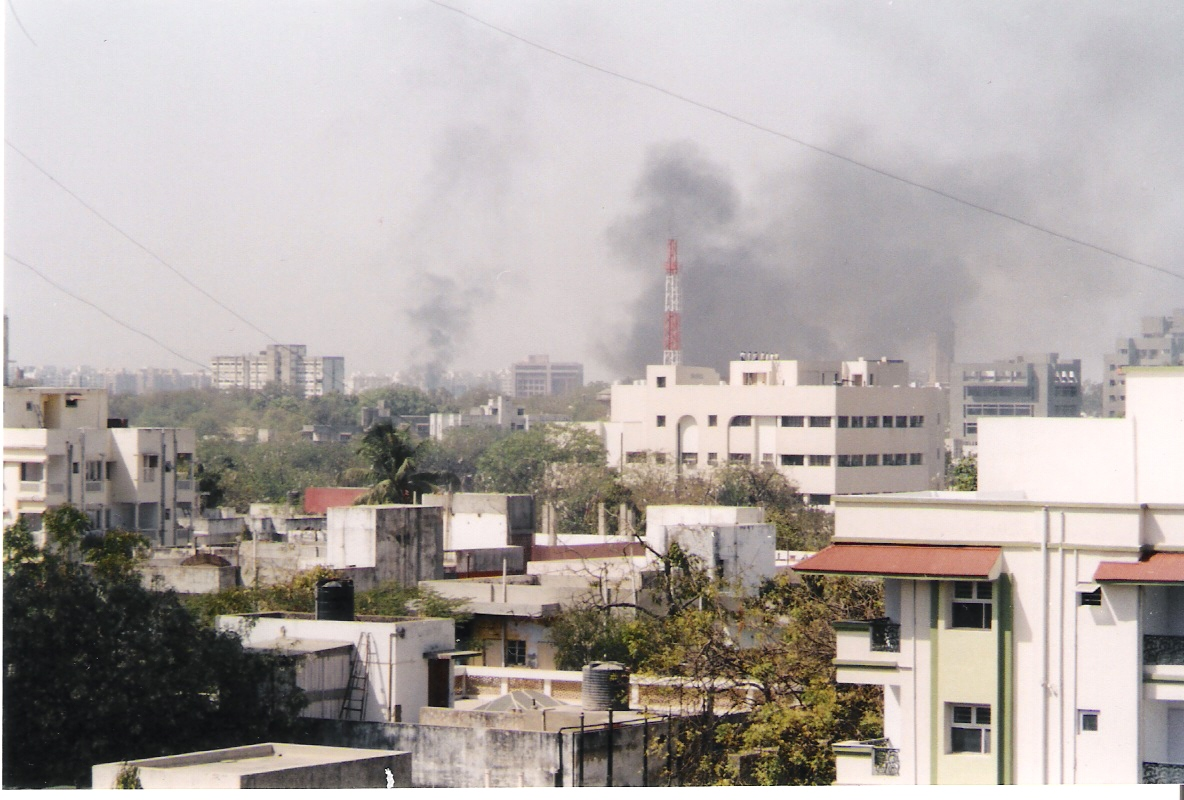
Communal riots on Ahmedabad, gujarat in February/March 2002.

Timeline of the history of Islam: 6th | 7th | 8th | 9th | 10th | 11th | 12th | 13th | 14th | 15th | 16th | 17th | 18th | 19th | 20th | 21st century

== 21st century (2001–2100) (1421 AH – 1527 AH) ==
=== 2001 ===
- Damascus Spring is brought to an end by the arrest of ten civil society activists who were sentenced to between two and ten years.
- Over several weeks beginning on March 2, the Taliban began the systematic shelling and dynamiting of two giant sixth century Buddhas carved into the side of a cliff in the Banyam valley in central Afghanistan. Mullah Mohammed Omar justified the destruction of this UNESCO World Heritage Site on the ground that they were idols under Islamic law.
- On September 11, members of the Al Qaeda terrorist organization attacked the United States by hijacking commercial airliners and flying them into the World Trade Center in New York City and the Pentagon in Arlington County, Virginia, killing upwards of three thousand. In response the United States government would declare a war on terror, beginning with the invasion of Afghanistan.
- The 7.7 M_{w} Gujarat earthquake shakes Western India with a maximum Mercalli intensity of X (Extreme), leaving 13,805–20,023 dead and about 166,800 injured.

=== 2002 ===
- General elections in Pakistan are held after the 1999 military takeover. PML (Q) led by Mian Muhammad Azhar, a pro-military party, gains majority throughout Pakistan. Mir Zafrullah Khan Jamali became the Prime Minister of Pakistan.
- The riots between Hindus and Muslims in Gujarat, India. More than 5000 reported killed, most of them Muslims.
- A terrorist group linked to Al-Qaeda kills more than 200 people in the 2002 Bali bombings.
- Chechen rebels take 800 hostages in the Moscow theater hostage crisis.

=== 2003 ===
- The United States leads the invasion of Iraq, searching for "weapons of mass destruction," starting the second Iraq War. As a result of US De-Ba'athification policy, former Iraqi soldiers and police form secret groups and begin insurgency.
- Shirin Ebadi becomes the first Muslim woman to win the Nobel Peace Prize for her efforts in promoting human rights.
- On April 5 Israel conducts the Ain es Saheb airstrike near Damascus, claiming the site was a terrorist training facility for members of Palestinian Islamic Jihad.
- Truck bombings in Riyadh, Saudi Arabia kill 34.
- Spanish restaurant and Jewish centers attacked in Casablanca, Morocco, killing 43 people.
- Attack on hotel in Jakarta, Indonesia kills 10.
- 52 killed in suicide attacks on British and Jewish targets in Istanbul.

=== 2004 ===
- The second-largest earthquake ever recorded occurs in the Indian Ocean, triggering the Asian tsunami. Indonesia suffers the heaviest damage with 167,736 dead, 37,063 missing and over 500,000 displaced.
- Pursuant to UN Security Council Resolution coalition forces hand over sovereignty of Iraq to caretaker government.
- Photos and documentation reveal extensive torture and abuse of prisoners by US military personnel at Abu Ghraib.
- US troops assault the Iraqi city of Fallujah.

=== 2005 ===
- Iraq holds election for National Assembly whose task was to draft constitution, which was ratified by popular vote that same year.
- Local body elections are held in Pakistan on non-party basis.
- Saudi Arabia's King Fahd dies. Fahd's brother Crown Prince Abdullah bin Abdul-Aziz, who had assumed de facto leadership of the country after King Fahd suffered a debilitating stroke in 1994, is declared king.
- A powerful, 7.6-magnitude earthquake hits the Azad Kashmir region of Pakistan, killing upwards of 73,000 people.
- On October 8 an earthquake in Pakistan kills thousands and leaves families homeless in Khyber-Pakhunkha/Hazara region. Multi story apartment building in Islamabad also collapsed.
- Israel removes Jewish settlers and military personnel from the Gaza Strip in August 2005, but continues control of its borders.
- Mahmoud Ahmadinejad wins Iranian presidential election.
- A high turnout among Muslims in Iraq parliamentary elections, despite insurgency.
- US attacked Iraq & casualties in Iraq pass the 2000 mark.

=== 2006 ===
- Israel invades part of Lebanon in pursuit of Hezbollah
- Execution by hanging of former Iraqi President Saddam Hussein after being found guilty of crimes against humanity.
- Muhammad Yunus wins Nobel Peace Prize for successful application of microcredit schemes to poor entrepreneurs in Bangladesh.

=== 2007 ===
- Pakistani leader Benazir Bhutto returns to Pakistan after 10 years of self-imposed exile.
- Death of Benazir Bhutto in an attack by terrorist at Liaqat Bagh, Rawalpindi. General elections were rescheduled.

=== 2008 ===
- In November 2008, 10 Pakistani members of Lashkar-e-Taiba, an Islamic militant organization, carried out a series of twelve coordinated shooting and bombing attacks lasting four days across Mumbai, India.

=== 2009 ===
- President Barack Obama delivers an address at Cairo University promising "A New Beginning" in US-Muslim relations.

=== 2010 ===
- Last US combat troops leave Iraq.
- Rima Fakih becomes the first Miss USA winner to claim the Muslim faith.

=== 2011 ===
- Tunisian Revolution, an intensive campaign of civil disobedience and protests begun in December 2010, ousts long-time President Zine El Abidine Ben Ali—the first of a series of upheavals known as Arab Spring.
- January 25 Revolution, a series of demonstrations, civil disobedience and strikes in Egyptian urban areas, part of the Arab Spring movement, resulted in the resignation of President Hosni Mubarak, who turned power over to a Supreme Council of the Armed Forces.
- Crack down in Syria on protests inspired by Arab Spring leads to Syrian Civil War. The opposition rebels are largely Sunni Muslims while loyalists are largely Alawites. A refugee crisis ensued with over 2 million Syrian refugees fleeing to Turkey, Jordan, Iraq and Lebanon.
- Militant uprising of the professional class, defecting soldiers and Islamists later backed by French, British and US airpower topple administration of Muammar Gaddafi (who is captured and executed), the power of which was assumed by the rebels' organization the National Transitional Council.
- Al-Qaeda leader Osama bin Laden killed by US Special Forces inside Pakistan.

9/11

=== 2012 ===
- Mohamed Morsi, a leading member of the Muslim Brotherhood, becomes the first democratically elected president in Egyptian history.

=== 2013 ===
- On 23 April 2013 died of Mullah_Omar. Mullah Muhammad Omar Mujahid (RA) was a personality who attained a unique place in the history of Islam. He was not only a great Mujahid and Islamic ruler but was also known for his piety, simplicity, and steadfastness.
- June 2013 Egyptian protests, a mass public demonstration against the administration of Mohamed Morsi, followed by a military coup d'état in which Morsi was deposed and arrested. After leading protests against the coup, the Muslim Brotherhood is officially banned by the end of the year.
- 2013 was the year in which the jihadist group Islamic State of Iraq and the Levant (ISIL or ISIS) adopted that name. The group expanded its territorial control in Syria and began to do so in Iraq also, and committed acts of terrorism in both countries and in Turkey. See also: Timeline of ISIL-related events (2013)

=== 2014 ===
- Islamic State of Iraq and the Levant invades Northern Iraq.
- In early 2014, the jihadist group Islamic State of Iraq and the Levant (ISIL or ISIS) captured extensive territory in Western Iraq in the Anbar campaign, while counter-offensives against it were mounted in Syria. Raqqa in Syria became its headquarters. The Wall Street Journal estimated that eight million people lived under its control in the two countries. In June the group proclaimed a "worldwide caliphate" and shortened its name to just "Islamic State" (IS). See also: Timeline of ISIL-related events (2014)
- On August, according to statements by the Iraqi government and others, ISIL militants buried alive an undefined number of Yazidi women and children in northern Iraq in an attack that killed 500 people. Those who escaped across the Tigris River into Kurdish-controlled areas of Syria on 10 August gave accounts of how they had seen individuals also attempting to flee who later died. Thousands of Yazidi women and girls were forced into sexual slavery by the Islamic State of Iraq and the Levant, and thousands of Yazidi men were killed. See also: Genocide of Yazidis by ISIL
- Islamic extremist group Boko Haram kidnaps 276 female students in northeast Nigeria.
- Badush prison massacre On 10 June 2014, the Islamic State of Iraq and the Levant (ISIS) killed at least 670 Shia prisoners in an attack on Badush prison. ISIL first separated out the Sunni inmates before executing the remaining prisoners. Moreover, there were 39 Indian construction workers who were executed in the region.
- Camp Speicher massacre occurred on 12 June 2014, when the Islamic State of Iraq and the Levant (ISIL) killed 1,700 or more Iraqi people in an attack on Camp Speicher in Tikrit, Iraq. At the time of the massacre, there were between 5,000 and 10,000 unarmed cadets in the camp, and ISIL fighters selected the Shias and non-Muslims for execution. It is the second deadliest act of terrorism in history.

=== 2015 ===
- 3 February: Islamic State of Iraq and the Levant (ISIL) released a video of Jordanian hostage Muath al-Kasasbeh being burned to death while locked in a cage. Also, ISIL launched another incursion into Arsal, Lebanon, from their base in the countryside near the Syrian border to the west of Flitah, making it the deadliest ISIL incursion into Lebanon since their incursion into Arsal in August 2014. See also: Timeline of ISIL-related events (2015)
- Saudi Arabian-led intervention in Yemen is an intervention launched by Saudi Arabia on 26 March 2015, in response to calls from the pro-Saudi president of Yemen Abdrabbuh Mansur Hadi for military support after he was ousted by the Houthi movement due to economic and political grievances, and fled to Saudi Arabia. The war received widespread criticism and had a dramatic worsening effect on Yemen's humanitarian situation, that reached the level of a "humanitarian disaster" or "humanitarian catastrophe", and many have labelled it as a genocide.

=== 2016 ===
- 9 February Iraqi government forces seized the final pocket of Islamic State of Iraq and the Levant (ISIL) resistance in the Husayba Al-Sharqiyah District, which was the last ISIL-held village to the east of Ramadi, thus fully expelling ISIL from the area of Ramadi. See also: Timeline of ISIL-related events (2016)
- 8 June: Mullah Taha came out as gay, becoming the first openly queer shia cleric.
- 2016 Karrada bombing On 3 July 2016, Islamic State of Iraq and the Levant (ISIL) militants carried out coordinated bomb attacks in Baghdad that killed 340 civilians and injured hundreds more. a suicide truck-bomb targeted the mainly Shia district of Karrada, busy with late night shoppers for Ramadan. A second roadside bomb was detonated in the suburb of Sha'ab, killing at least five.
- 17 October a major military campaign launched by the Iraqi Army and the Iraqi Popular Mobilization Forces to liberate the city of Mosul from the control of the Islamic State of Iraq and the Levant. See also: Mosul liberation

=== 2017 ===
- 10 July Iraqi Prime Minister Haider al-Abadi officially announced the liberation of the city of Mosul from the control of the Islamic State of Iraq and the Levant. See also: Timeline of ISIL-related events (2017)
- 9 December Prime Minister Haider al-Abadi announce of the complete liberation of Iraqi lands from the hands of the Islamic State of Iraq and the Levant, known in the Middle East as Daesh (ISIL).

=== 2018 ===
- Turkey President Recep Tayyip Erdoğan warned that if the Austrian government closes Mosques and expels Muslims, it could lead to war. He said, “These measures taken by the Austrian prime minister are, I fear, leading the world towards a war between the cross and the crescent, "They say they're going to kick our religious men out of Austria. Do you think we will not react if you do such a thing?” he asked, quoted by AFP. “That means we're going to have to do something".
- Death of Sami-ul-Haq. On 2 November 2018, Sami-ul-Haq was stabbed multiple times at around 7:00 pm PST at his residence in Bahria Town, Rawalpindi.

=== 2019 ===
- 2019–2021 Jammu and Kashmir lockdown: India locks down the entire Kashmir valley (a Muslim majority state).

=== 2020 ===
- 2020 Nagorno-Karabakh war from 27 September – 10 November was an armed conflict between Azerbaijan, supported by Turkey, and the self-proclaimed Republic of Artsakh together with Armenia, in the disputed region of Nagorno-Karabakh.

=== 2021 ===
- On 15 August 2021, Taliban forces seize control of most of Afghanistan and declare the Islamic Emirate of Afghanistan.

=== 2023 ===
- June: Professional ice hockey player Nazem Kadri became the first Muslim to win the Stanley Cup for the Colorado Avalanche team.
- October: Hamas launches an attack on Israel on October 7.

=== 2024 ===
- Fall of the Assad regime. On 8 December 2024, the Assad regime collapsed during a major offensive by opposition forces.
