= Timeline of the history of Islam (15th century) =

Timeline of the history of Islam: 6th | 7th | 8th | 9th | 10th | 11th | 12th | 13th | 14th | 15th | 16th | 17th | 18th | 19th | 20th | 21st century

This is a timeline of major events in the Muslim world from 1400 AD to 1499 AD (803 AH – 905 AH).

== 1400–1409 ==
=== Golden Horde ===
- ca. 1400: Temur Qutlugh dies and is succeeded by Shadi Beg.
- 1407: Shadi Beg is deposed and Edigu installs Pulad Khan as his successor.

=== Mamluk Empire ===
- 1400: The Burji Mamluks lose Syria to Tamerlane.

=== Ottoman Empire ===
- 1402–1403: Beyazid I is defeated at the Battle of Ankara and taken captive by Tamerlane. An interregnum period begins when the sons of Beyazid I compete for the Ottoman throne.

=== Timurid Empire ===
- 1405: Tamerlane dies and is succeeded by his son, Shah Rukh.

== 1410–1419 ==
=== Golden Horde ===
- 1410: Pulad Khan is deposed in favor of Timur.
- 1412: Timur is deposed in favor of Jalal ad-Din khan, the first of Tokhtamysh's sons to take power since his death.
- 1413: Jalal ad-Din khan is deposed in favor of his brother, Karim Berdi.
- 1414: Karim Berdi is deposed in favor of Kebek.
- 1416: Kebek Khan is deposed in favor of Yeremferden, the brother of Karim Berdi and Jalal ad-Din khan.
- 1419: Yeremferden is assassinated; control of the Horde is split between Dawlat Berdi and Olugh Mokhammad.

=== Ottoman Empire ===
- 1413: Interregnum period ends and Mehmed I becomes Sultan.

=== Nogai Horde ===
- 1419: Edigu is assassinated by Olugh Mokhammad, who assumes his place as Khan, re-uniting it with the Golden Horde.

== 1420–1429 ==
=== Golden Horde ===
- 1420: Dawlat Berdi captures Sarai and expands his sphere of influence beyond the Crimean Peninsula.
- 1423: Baraq defeats Dawlat Berdi and Olugh Mokhammad and takes control of the Horde. Olugh Mokhammad flees to Lithuania.
- 1427: With the assistance of Vytautas the Great, Olugh Mokhammad and Dawlat Berdi defeat and kill Baraq.

=== Kara Koyunlu ===
- 1420: Qara Yusuf dies and is succeeded by his son, Qara Iskander.

=== Morocco ===
- 1420: Abu Said Othman is assassinated and succeeded by Abdul Haq, his infant son.

=== Tunisia ===
- 1424: The Hafsids come to power.
- 1429: The Hafsids attack the island of Malta and take 3000 slaves although they do not conquer the island. Piracy against Christian shipping particularly grows during the rule of Abd al-Aziz II (1394–1434).

=== Uzbeks ===
- 1425: Abul Khayr takes control of the Little jüz.

== 1430–1440 ==
=== Ak Koyunlu ===
- 1434: Qara Osman dies and is succeeded by Ali Beg.
- 1438: Ali Beg is overthrown by his brother, Hamza.

=== Golden Horde ===
- 1432: Dawlat Berdi is assassinated and Hacı I Giray conquers the Crimea, founding the Crimean Khanate.
- 1437: Olugh Mokhammad is defeated by Sayid Ahmad I, who takes control of the Horde.

=== Kara Koyunlu ===
- 1434: Qara Iskandar is deposed in favor of his brother, Jahan Shah.

=== Khanate of Kazan ===
- 1438: Olugh Mokhammad founds the Khanate of Kazan.

=== Mamluk Empire ===
- 1438: Barsbay dies and his son, Jamaluddin Yusuf, is prevented from taking power in a coup orchestrated by Saifuddin Gakmuk.

=== Tunisia ===
- 1434: Abdul Faris dies after forty years of rule and is succeeded by Abu Abdullah Muhammad.
- 1435: Abu Abdullah Muhammad is deposed in favor of Abu Umar Othman.

=== Uzbeks ===
- 1430: Abul Khayr occupies Khwarezmia.

== 1440–1449 ==
=== Ak Koyunlu ===
- 1440: Hamza is overthrown by Jahangir, a son of Ali Beg.

=== Ottoman Empire ===
- 1444: The Anti-Ottoman League of Lezhe in Albania is formed by Scanderbeg. Murad II voluntarily abdicates from his throne in favor of his son Mehmed II after the former's defeat at the hands of crusaders at the Battle of Varna.
- 1446: Murad II reclaims the throne.
- 1448: The Ottomans are victorious at the Second Battle of Kosovo. Serbia is annexed and Bosnia is made a vassal.

=== Timurid Empire ===
- 1446: Shah Rukh dies and is succeeded by Ulugh Beg.
- 1449: Ulugh Beg dies and is succeeded by 'Abd al-Latif.

=== Uzbeks ===
- 1449: Abul Khayr captures Farghana.

== 1450–1459 ==
=== Ak Koyunlu ===
- 1453: Jahangir dies and is succeeded by his son, Uzun Hassan.

=== Great Horde ===
- 1459: Küchük Muhammad dies and is succeeded by his son, Maxmud.

=== Mamluk Empire ===
- 1453: Gakmuk dies and is succeeded by his son, Fakhruddin Othman, who is then overthrown by Saifuddin Inal.

=== Ottoman Empire ===
- 1451: Murad II dies and is succeeded by his son, Mehmed II.
- 1453: Constantinople is captured.
- 1456: Wallachia is made a vassal.

=== Timurid Empire ===
- 1450: 'Abd al-Latif is assassinated and succeeded by Abu Sa'id.

== 1460–1469 ==
=== Ottoman Empire ===
- 1462: Albania is annexed.

=== Mamluk Empire ===
- 1461: Saifuddin Inal died and is succeeded by his son, Shahabuddin Ahmad, who is then overthrown by Saifuddin Khushqadam.

=== Great Horde ===
- 1465: Maxmud founds the Astrakhan Khanate after he is deposed by his brother, Akhmat Khan.

=== Kara Koyunlu ===
- 1467: Jahan Shah is killed in a surprise attack arranged by his rival, Uzun Hasan, leader of Ak Koyunlu. Ak Koyunlu then annexes Kara Koyunlu.

=== Morocco ===
- 1465: Abdul Haq is assassinated, ending the Marinid dynasty. Sharif Muhammad al Jati assumes power.

=== Mamluk Empire ===
- 1465: Khushqadam dies and is succeeded by his son, Saifuddin Yel Bey, who is then deposed by Temur Bugha.
- 1468: Temur Bugha is deposed by Qaitbay.

=== Kazakh Khanate ===
- 1465: Kazakh nobles Abu Sa'id Janibek Khan and Kerei Khan rebel against Uzbek ruler Abu'l-Khayr Khan and form their own independent state, the Kazakh Khanate.

=== Uzbeks ===
- 1468: Abu'l-Khayr Khan dies and is succeeded by his son Haidar Sultan.

=== Ak Koyunlu ===
- 1467: Kara Koyunlu is annexed.
- 1468: The Timurids are defeated at the Battle of Qarabagh. Ak Koyunlu then becomes the masters of Persia and Khorasan.

=== Timurid Empire ===
- 1469: Abu Sa'id dies; the Timurid state. In Husayn Bayqarah maintains control of Greater Khorasan.

== 1470–1479 ==
=== Morocco ===
- 1472: Sharif Muhammad al Jati is overthrown by Muhammad al Shaikh, establishing the Wattasid dynasty.

=== Kazakh Khanate ===
- 1473: Kerei Khan, the first ruler of the Kazakh Khanate, dies and Abu Sa'id Janibek Khan succeeds him as the empire's second ruler.

=== Ottoman Empire ===
- 1473: Mehmed II defeats sultan Uzun Hasan of Ak Koyunlu at the Battle of Otluk Beli.
- 1475: The Khanate of Crimea is conquered and made a vassal state. Venice is defeated and the Ottoman Empire becomes master of the Aegean Sea.

=== Ak Koyunlu ===
- 1478: Uzun Hasan dies and is succeeded by his son, Khalil ibn Uzun Hasan.
- 1479: Khalil Hasan is overthrown by his uncle, Y‘aqub ibn Uzun Hasan.

== 1480–1489 ==
=== Great Horde ===
- 1480: Akhmat Khan is assassinated and succeeded by his son, Said Ahmad II.
- 1481: Said Ahmad II is overthrown by his brother Murtada.

=== Kazakh Khanate ===
- 1480: Abu Sa'id Janibek Khan dies and is succeeded by his nephew Burunduk, who is the son of Kerei Khan.

=== Ottoman Empire ===
- 1481: Mehmed II dies and is succeeded by Beyazid II. Cen Sultan rebels.

=== Uzbeks ===
- 1488: Haider Sultan dies and is succeeded by his nephew, Shaybani Khan.

=== Tunisia ===
- 1488: Abu Umar Othman dies and is succeeded by Abu Zikriya Yahya.
- 1489: Abu Zikriya Yahya is overthrown by Abul Mumin.

== 1490–1500 ==
=== Tunisia ===
- 1490: Abul Mumin is overthrown and Abu Zikriya Yahya retakes the throne.

=== Iberia ===
- 1492: Granada is captured by Spain, ending 800 years of Muslim rule in Spain.

=== Ak Koyunlu ===
- 1493: Y‘aqub ibn Uzun Hasan dies and is succeeded by his son, Baisonqur ibn Y‘aqub.
- 1495: Baisonqur is overthrown by his cousin, Rustam ibn Maqsud.
- 1497: Maqsud is overthrown by his cousin, Ahmad Gövde ibn Muhammad.

=== Mamluk Empire ===
- 1496: Qaitbay abdicates and is succeeded by his son, Nasir Muhammad.
- 1498: Nasir Muhammad is deposed and replaced by Zahir Kanauh.

=== Uzbeks ===
- 1499: Shaybani Khan conquers Transoxiana.

=== Great Horde ===
- 1499: Murtada dies and is succeeded by Said Ahmad III.

=== Ottoman Empire ===
- 1499: the Ottoman fleet defeats the Venetians in the Battle of Zonchio.

== See also ==
Timeline of Muslim history
