= Timeline of the history of Islam (9th century) =

Timeline of the history of Islam: 6th | 7th | 8th | 9th | 10th | 11th | 12th | 13th | 14th | 15th | 16th | 17th | 18th | 19th | 20th | 21st century

== 9th century (801–900 CE / 184–288 AH) ==
- 801: Death of Rābiʿa al-ʿAdawiyya al-Qaysiyya famous Arab Muslim saint and Sufi mystic.
- 802: The Mecca Protocol: Caliph Harun al-Rashid and the leading officials of the Abbasid Caliphate perform the hajj to Mecca, where the line of succession is finalized. Harun's eldest son al-Amin is named heir, but his second son Abdallah al-Ma'mun is named as al-Amin's heir, and governor of Khurasan. A third son, al-Qasim, is added as third heir, and receives responsibility over the frontier areas with the Byzantine empire.
- 803: Downfall of the Barmakids. Execution of Ja'far ibn Yahya. Marriage of caliph Harun al-Rashid and Umm Muhammad bint Salih.
- 805: Outbreak of revolt of Rafi ibn al-Layth in Khurasan.
- 806: Harun al-Rashid leads a huge campaign against the Byzantines.
- 809: Death of Harun al-Rashid. Accession of al-Amin.
- 810: Muhammad al-Taqi, the 9th Shia Imam was born.
- 811: Abbasid Civil War: Battle of Ray (811) in Persia.
- 812, August: Abbasid Civil War: the Siege of Baghdad begins
- 813, September: Abbasid Civil War: the Siege of Baghdad ends with the capture of the city by the forces of al-Ma'mun and the death of al-Amin
- 813: Tahir ibn Husayn appointed as Governor of Mosul by Al-Ma'mun
- 815: Zaydi revolt under Abu'l-Saraya in Iraq. Harthama ibn A'yan quells the revolt.
- 816: Shi'a revolt in Mecca; In al-Andalus the Umayyads capture the island of Corsica. Harthama ibn A'yan is executed.
- 818: Ali al-Rida dies in Mashhad. Muhammad al-Taqi becomes Imam. The Umayyads of Spain capture the islands of Ibiza, Mallorca, and Sardinia.
- 820: Tahir ibn Husayn, Caliph al-Ma'mun appointed Tahir as Governor of Khorasan. In 820 Abdallah ibn Tahir was appointed governor of Syria.
- 822: Death of al-Hakam I in Spain; accession of Abd ar-Rahman II.
- 822: Death of Tahir in Khurasan. Talha was appointed Governor by Al-Ma'mun in 822. Jafar ibn al-Mu'tasim (future Al-Mutawakkil) born in Baghdad.
- ca. 825: Establishment of the Emirate of Crete.
- 826: Abdallah ibn Tahir, appointed as Governor of Egypt.
- 827: Ali al-Hadi, the 10th Shia Imam is born. Ma'mun declares the Mu'tazili creed as the state religion. Beginning of the Muslim conquest of Sicily.
- 828: Abdallah ibn Tahir appointed as Governor of Khorasan by Al-Ma'mun in 828.
- 833: 9 August— Death of Ma'mun. Accession of al-Mu'tasim.
- 835: Muhammad al-Taqi is poisoned. Ali al-Hadi becomes Imam.
- 836: al-Mu'tasim moves the capital to Samarra.
- 837: Revolt of the Jats.
- 838: Revolt of Babak Khorramdin in Azarbaijan suppressed. Sack of Amorium by al-Mu'tasim. Death of Abbasid prince Al-Abbas ibn al-Ma'mun.
- 839: Revolt of Mazyar in Tabaristan. The Muslims occupy South Italy. Capture of the city of Messina in Sicily.
- 842: 5 January— Death of al-Mu'tasim, accession of al-Wathiq. Death of Qaratis, mother of al-Wathiq in August 16, 842.
- 843: Revolts of the Arabs. Unsuccessful Byzantine attempt to reconquer the Emirate of Crete.
- 845: Death of the Abdallah ibn Tahir al-Khurasani Governor of Khorasan. In 845 Abbasid caliph Al-Wathiq appointed Tahir ibn Abdallah ibn Tahir as governor of Khorasan.
- 846: Battle of Mauropotamos between Byzantines and Abbasids in Asia Minor.
- 846: Hasan al-Askari, the 11th Shia Imam is born.
- 847: Death of Wathiq, accession of al-Mutawakkil.
- 850: Al-Mutawakkil restores orthodoxy.
- 852: Death of Abd ar-Rahman II of Spain;. accession of Muhammad I.
- 856: Umar ibn Abd al-Aziz al-Habbari was appointed as Governor of Sind by the Abbasid caliph Al-Mutawakkil. On 23 February 856, there was an exchange of captives with the Byzantine Empire. A second such exchange took place some four years later.
- 858: Al-Mutawakkil founds the town of Jafariya.
- 861: Assassination of the Abbasid Caliph al-Mutawakkil; accession of al-Muntasir and beginning of the "Anarchy at Samarra". Birth of famous Arab poet and prince Abdallah ibn al-Mu'tazz.
- 862: Abbasid conquest of Faruriyyah in Summer of 862. Al-Muntasir poisoned to death; accession of al-Musta'in.
- 863: The Battle of Lalakaon breaks the power of the emirate of Malatya. Start of the Byzantine counter-offensive.
- 864: Zaydi state established in Tabaristan by Hasan ibn Zayd (Alavids).
- 866: Abbasid Civil War: Al-Musta'in flees from Samarra, his deposition and accession of al-Mu'tazz; Muhammad ibn Yusuf Al-Ukhaidhir, a descendant of Ali, establishes an independent kingdom in Yamamah.
- 867: Ya'qub ibn al-Layth al-Saffar founds the Saffarid rule in Sistan.
- 868: Ali al-Hadi is poisoned. Hasan al-Askari becomes Imam. Muhammad al-Mahdi, the last Imam of shiite is born. Ahmad ibn Tulun finds the Tulunid rule in Egypt.
- 869: The Abbasid Caliph Mu'tazz forced to abdicate, his death and accession of al-Muhtadi. Beginning of Zanj Rebellion in Basra.
- 870: Turks revolt against Muhtadi, his death and accession of al-Mu'tamid. Fragmentation of Abbasid Empire into several autonomous dynasties like; Samanid, Saffarids, Tulunids, Sajid.
- 871: Bari is captured by Louis II of Italy, ending the Emirate of Bari.
- 873: Muhammad ibn Tahir, the governor of Khorasan was overthrew by rebels.
- 874: Hasan al-Askari is poisoned. Muhammad al-Mahdi becomes Imam. Zanji state established at al-Muktara during the Zanj Rebellion in South Iraq. Death of the Samanid ruler Ahmad, accession of Nasr I.
- 875: Death of Abbasid official, Abdallah ibn Muhammad ibn Yazdad al-Marwazi. Death of Muhammad ibn Ahmad Abbasid vassal Emir of Ifriqiya.
- 876: April 8 – Battle of Dayr al-'Aqul: Abbasid forces, led by Al-Muwaffaq, halt a Saffarid rebellion on the River Tigris. The rebel Ya'qub ibn al-Layth tries to capture the Abbasid Caliphate's capital of Baghdad, but he is forced, with his army, to retreat.
- 877: Death of Ya'qub ibn al-Layth al-Saffar in Sistan, accession of Amr bin Layth.
- 878: Fall of Syracuse to the Muslims.
- 879: Zanj Rebellion: The Abbasid Caliphate concentrates its efforts against the Zanj rebels in Mesopotamia. The Abbasid general Abu'l-Abbas Ahmad (future caliph Al-Mu'tadid) leads an expeditionary force (10,000 men) to suppress the revolt. This marks the turning-point of the war.
- 883: End of Zanj Rebellion
- 884: Abdullah ibn Umar al'Habbari (884-913) succeeded his father as ruler of Sindh. His father Umar ended up creating a hereditary dynasty in Sindh because of Anarchy at Samarra and Fifth Fitna
- 885: Death of Ahmad ibn Tulun in Egypt, accession of Khumarawayh ibn Ahmad ibn Tulun.
- 886: Death of Muhammad I the Umayyad ruler of Spain, accession of al-Mundhir. Death of Abdullah ibn Umar the Habbari ruler of Sind.
- 888: Death of Mundhir the Umayyad ruler of Spain, accession of Abdullah ibn Muhammad al-Umawi.
- 891: The Qarmatian state established at Bahrain.
- 892: Abbasid Caliph al-Mu'tamid death. al-Mu'tadid becomes Caliph. Death of the Samanid ruler Nasr, accession of Ismail I.
- 893: Zaydi Imamate is established in Yemen by al-Hadi Yahya ibn al-Husayn ibn al-Qasim
- 894: The Rustamids become the vassals of Spain.
- 896: Death of Khumarawayh ibn Ahmad ibn Tulun; accession of Abu 'l-Asakir Jaysh.
- 897: Assassination of Abu 'l-Asakir Jaysh; accession of Abu Musa Harun.
- 898: Qarmatians sack Basra. By the end of this century, global Muslim population had grown to 3 percent of the total.
- 899: Birth of Muhammad ibn Ahmad al-Mu'tadid the future Abbasid caliph Al-Qahir, he ruled from 932 to 934.

== See also ==
- Timeline of Muslim history
