= Timeline of the history of Islam (8th century) =

This is a timeline of major events in the Muslim world from 701 AD to 800 AD (81 BH – 184 AH).

Timeline of the history of Islam: 6th | 7th | 8th | 9th | 10th | 11th | 12th | 13th | 14th | 15th | 16th | 17th | 18th | 19th | 20th | 21st century

== 8th century (701–800 CE / 81–184 AH) ==
- 701: Ibn al-Ash'ath's rebellion in Iraq, battle of Dayr al-Jamajim.
- 703: Ja'far al-Sadiq, the sixth Imam of Shia Islam, is born.
- 705: Death of caliph Abd al-Malik. Accession of Al-Walid I as Umayyad Caliph.
- 711: Conquest of Spain by Tariq ibn Ziyad and of Transoxiana by Qutayba ibn Muslim.
- 712: Conquest of Sindh by Muhammad ibn Qasim
- 713: Ali ibn Husayn, the fourth Imam of Shia was poisoned and martyred. Muhammad al-Baqir becomes Imam. Conquest of Multan.
- 715: Death of Walid I. Sulayman ibn Abd al-Malik becomes Umayyad Caliph.
  View of the Umayyad mosque built between 705 and 715 by Al-Walid I, Damascus, Syria.
- 717: Beginning of the Second Arab siege of Constantinople. Death of Sulayman. Umar II becomes Umayyad Caliph. Pact of Umar.
- 718 End of the Second Arab siege of Constantinople.
- 720: Death of Umar II. Yazid II becomes Umayyad Caliph.
- 721: First Turgesh invasion into Transoxiana under Kursul.
- 724: Death of Yazid II. Hisham becomes Umayyad Caliph. Turgesh defeat Muslim ibn Sa'id al-Kilabi in the Day of Thirst.
- 725: The Muslims occupy Nîmes in France.
- 729: Khurasani army under Ashras ibn Abdallah al-Sulami scores a narrow victory over the Turgesh at the Battle of Baykand and recovers Bukhara. The retreating Turgesh undertake the Siege of Kamarja.
- 730: Khazars invade northwestern Iran and defeat the Umayyad forces at the Battle of Marj Ardabil, killing the Arab governor al-Djarrah al-Hakami and briefly occupying the town
- 731: Khurasani Arab army suffers horrendous casualties at the Battle of the Defile against the Turgesh. 20,000 Iraqi troops are sent to Khurasan to replenish losses.
- 732: The Battle of Tours in France.
- 734: Rebellion of al-Harith ibn Surayj erupts in Khurasan.
- 735: Asad ibn Abdallah al-Qasri arrives in Khurasan and suppresses al-Harith's rebellion.
- 737: The Muslims meet a reverse at Avignon in France.
- 737: Marwan ibn Muhammad (later Caliph Marwan II) poured across the Caucasus and eventually defeated a Khazar army led by Hazer Tarkhan, briefly occupying Atil itself.
- 737: At the Battle of Kharistan, Asad ibn Abdallah al-Qasri drives back the Turgesh invasion of Khurasan.
- 740: Shi'a Zaydi Revolt under Zayd ibn Ali. Berber revolt in North Africa. Battle of the Nobles. Battle of Akroinon against the Byzantines.
- 741: Battle of Bagdoura in North Africa.
- 742: The Muslim rule restored in Qairawan.
- 743: Muhammad al-Baqir is poisoned. Jafar al-Sadiq becomes Imam. Death of Hisham. Al-Walid II becomes Umayyad Caliph. Shi'a revolt in Khurasan under Yahya ibn Zayd.
- 744: Deposition of Walid II. Yazid III becomes Umayyad Caliph and dies the same year. Ibrahim becomes Umayyad Caliph and is overthrown the same year. Battle of Ain al Jurr. Marwan II becomes Umayyad Caliph.
- 745: Musa al-Kazim, the seventh Imam of Shiite is born. (Ismail bin Jafar is the 7th rightful Imam according to Ismaili Shia.)Kufa and Mosul occupied by the Kharijites.
- 746: Battle of Rupar Thutha, Kufa and Mosul occupied by Marwan II.
- 747: Revolt of Abu Muslim in Khurasan.
- 748: Battle of Ray (811).
- 749: Battle of Isfahan and Battle of Nihawand. Capture of Kufa by the Abbasids. Al-Saffah becomes the Abbasid Caliph at Kufa.
- 750: Battle of Zab. Fall of Damascus. End of the Umayyads.
- 751: Conquest of Wasit by the Abbasids. Murder of the Minister Abu Salama.
- 751: In the Battle of Talas, the Abbasid armies defeat Tang Dynasty of China.
- 754: Death of al-Saffah. Accession of al-Mansur as the Caliph. Rebellion of al-Mansur's uncle Abdallah ibn Ali.
- 755: Murder of Abu Muslim. Sunbadh revolt in Khurasan.
- 756: Abd-ar-rahman I founds the independent Umayyad state in Spain.
- 758: Khazar army under Ras Tarkhan invaded and temporarily occupied parts of Azerbaijan and Arran.
- 759: Abbasid conquest of Tabaristan.
- 761: Abbasid heir Muhammad ibn al-Mansur (future caliph Al-Mahdi) married famous Abbasid princess Rayta bint al-Saffah as his first wife after his return from Khurasan.
- 762: Revolt of Muhammad al-Nafs al-Zakiyya.
- 763: Foundation of Baghdad. Defeat of the Abbasids in Spain.
- 765: Jafar al-Sadiq, who is the sixth imam of Shiite is poisoned. Musa al-Kazim becomes Imam. Ali ar Rida the eighth imam was born.
- 766: Sayram in Central Asia taken from the Nestorians. Evangelical army of Arab Muslims and recent converts led by Abd al-Aziz.
- 767: Khariji state set up by Ibn Madrar at Sijilmasa. Ustad Sees revolt in Khurasan.
- 772: Battle of Janbi in North Africa. Rustamid state set up in Morocco.
- 775: Death or the Abbasid Caliph Al-Mansur, accession of Al-Mahdi.
- 776: Al-Mahdi's second wife was Asma, She grew up at the court. In 775–776, Al-Mahdi formed a sudden attachment for her. He married her, settling on her a marriage portion of one million dirhams. Al-Mahdi divorced Asma bint Atta within months and married al-Khayzuran bint Atta as his third wife.
- 777: Siege of Saragossa in Spain.
- 782: Harun ibn al-Mahdi (future Harun al-Rashid) leads a huge expedition against the Byzantines and reaches Chalcedon. Harun was nominated as second heir of the Caliphate.
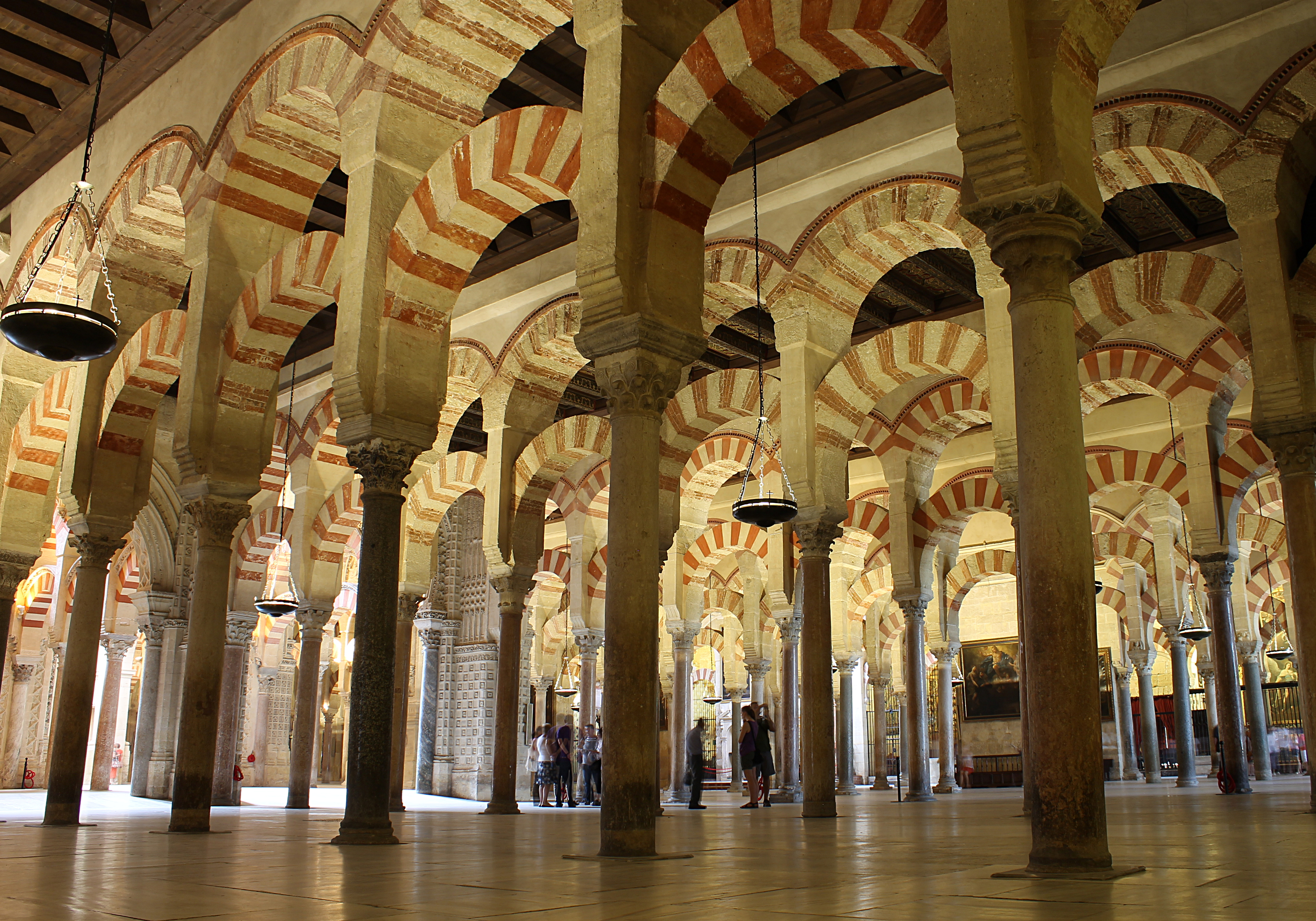
  View of the Great Mosque of Córdoba built in 785 by the Umayyad emir Abd al-Rahman I, Córdoba, Spain.
- 785: Death of the Caliph Mahdi. Accession of Al-Hadi.
- 786: Alid rebellion in Mecca is suppressed in the Battle of Fakhkh.
- 786: Death of Hadi. Accession of Harun al-Rashid.
- 788: Idrisid state set up in the Maghreb. Death of Abd ar-Rahman I of Spain, and accession of Hisham I.
- 792: Invasion of South France.
- 796: Death of Hisham in Spain; accession of al-Hakam I.
- 799: Defeat of an invasion by the Khazars.
- 800: Musa al-Kazim is poisoned in prison of Harun al-Rashid. Ali al-Rida becomes Imam. Autonomous Aghlabid rule is established in North Africa.
- By the end of this century, global Muslim population had grown to 2 percent of the total (centred on Iraq).
