= Immortal =

Immortality is the ability to live forever, or eternal life.

Immortal or Immortality may also refer to:

== Film ==
- The Immortals (1995 film), an American crime film
- Immortality, an alternate title for the 1998 British film The Wisdom of Crocodiles
- Immortality (2016 film), an Iranian experimental drama
- Immortal (2004 film), a French science fiction film by Enki Bilal
- Immortals (2011 film), an American mythical action film
- Immortal (2015 film), an Iranian drama
- Immortal (2022 film), a Finnish action film
- The Immortals (2015 film), an Indian documentary
- The Immortal (2018 film), a Vietnamese fantasy film
- The Immortal (2019 film), an Italian crime film
- Immortal (2019 film), an American thriller
- Immortals (2024 film), a Swiss documentary
- Immortal (2026 film), an Indian Tamil language film

== Literature ==
- Immortals, the elected members of the Académie Française
- Immortal (Buffy novel), a 1999 Buffy the Vampire Slayer novelization by Christopher Golden and Nancy Holder
- Immortal (Image Comics), a comic book superhero character from the Image Comics series Invincible
- Immortal (trilogy), a series of three science fiction graphic novels
- Immortals (anthology), 1998, edited by Jack Dann and Gardner Dozois
- Immortality (novel), 1990, by Milan Kundera
- "The Immortal" (short story), 1949, by Jorge Luis Borges
- The Immortals (Barjavel novel), 1973, by René Barjavel
- The Immortals (Hickman novel), 1996, by Tracy and Laura Hickman
- The Immortals (The Edge Chronicles), a novel in Paul Stewart and Chris Riddell's Edge Chronicles series
- The Immortals (series), a fantasy series by Tamora Pierce
- The Immortals (novel series), a fantasy series by Alyson Noel
- The Immortals, by James Gunn, the inspiration of the television series The Immortal
- Thirty-Six Immortals of Poetry, a group of medieval Japanese poets

== Military ==
- Immortals (Achaemenid Empire)
- Immortals (Sasanian Empire)
- Immortals (Byzantine Empire)
- Napoleonic Old Guard (France), nicknamed "Immortals"
- Immortal 32, a nickname for the Siege of the Alamo relief force
- Akali Nihungs, Sikh warriors of whom the former part of the name literally means "immortals"

== Music ==
=== Artists and labels ===
- Immortal (band), a Norwegian black metal musical group
- The Immortals (band), a Belgian techno group
- Immortal Records, a record label
- Immortal Technique (born 1978), Peruvian born American rapper and urban activist
- Roger Nichols (recording engineer) (1944–2011), American recording engineer, nicknamed "The Immortal"

=== Albums ===
- Immortal (Ann Wilson album), 2018
- Immortal (Anthem album), 2006
- Immortal (Beth Hart album), 1996
- Immortal (Bob Catley album), 2008
- Immortal (Cynthia Clawson album), 1986
- Immortal (D'espairsRay album), 2009
- Immortal (For Today album), a 2010 Christian metalcore album
- Immortal (Immortal EP), 1991 black metal album
- Immortal (Lorna Shore album), 2020 deathcore album
- Immortal (Michael Jackson album), 2011
- Immortal (Pyramaze album), 2008
- Immortal (Sarah Geronimo album) or Music and Me, a 2009 pop album
- Immortal (Tim Dog album), 2003
- Immortal? (Arena album), 2000
- Immortals (album), 2017, by Firewind

=== Songs ===
- Immortal (The Crüxshadows EP), 2008
- "Immortal" (21 Savage song), 2019
- "Immortal" (J. Cole song), 2016, from 4 Your Eyez Only
- "Immortal" (Kid Cudi song), a 2013 single on Indicud
- "Immortal", by Adema from Insomniac's Dream
- "Immortal", by Atreyu from The Beautiful Dark of Life
- "Immortal", by Clutch from Pure Rock Fury
- "Immortal", by Dream Evil from In the Night
- "Immortal", by Elley Duhé
- "Immortal", by Helloween from The Dark Ride
- "Immortal", by Lil Gotit from Hood Baby 2
- "Immortal", by Lorna Shore from Immortal
- "Immortal", by Lord from Fallen Idols
- "Immortal", by Marina and the Diamonds from Froot
- "Immortal", by Riot V from Unleash the Fire
- "Immortal", by Simi from Omo Charlie Champagne, Vol. 1
- "Immortal", by The Rasmus from Hide from the Sun
- "Immortal", by Thomas Bergersen from Illusions
- "Immortal", by War of Ages from Return to Life
- "Immortal", by Warkings from Morgana
- "Immortals" (song), 2014, by Fall Out Boy
- "Immortals", by Hieroglyphics from The Kitchen
- "The Immortals" (song), a 2011 single by Kings of Leon from Come Around Sundown
- "I Feel Immortal", 2010, by Tarja recorded by Kerli under the title "Immortal"
- "Immortality" (Pearl Jam song), a 1995 single on Vitalogy
- "Immortality" (Celine Dion song), a 1998 single on Let's Talk About Love
- "Immortality", a 1975 single by Lesley Gore from Love Me by Name

== Sports ==
- Immortal (professional wrestling), a heel pro wrestling stable
- Immortals (esports), esports organization founded in 2015
- Martín Dihigo (1906-1971), also called The Immortal, Cuban professional baseball player
- Matt Brown (fighter), MMA fighter nicknamed The Immortal
- The Immortals (rugby league), the name given to the greatest rugby league players in Australia

== Television ==
- Immortal (Highlander), sword-wielding characters from the Highlander film and television series
- "Immortality (Fringe)", a 2011 episode of Fringe
- The Immortal (1970 TV series), a 1970–1971 American television series
- The Immortal (2000 TV series), a 2000–2001 Canadian television series
- The Immortal (Buffyverse), a character in the Buffy the Vampire Slayer universe
- Imortal, a 2010 Philippine TV series
- "The Immortals" (NCIS), an episode of NCIS
- "Immortality" (CSI: Crime Scene Investigation), the series finale of CSI: Crime Scene Investigation
- Immortality (TV series), an upcoming Chinese television series based on the BL xianxia novel The Husky and His White Cat Shizun
- Immortals (TV series), a 2018 Turkish web series

== Video games ==
- Immortal (MUD), an administrator or developer on a MUD
- The Immortal (video game), a 1990 isometric action-adventure game
- The Immortals, a fictional group in the 2024 action-adventure game Prince of Persia: The Lost Crown
- Immortality (video game), a 2022 cinematic video game

== Other uses ==
- Immortal (comics), various characters and series
- Immortal: The Invisible War, a table top, role-playing game by Ran Valerhon
- Immortal Game, a chess game played in 1851 by Adolf Anderssen against Lionel Kieseritzky
- Eight Immortals, a group of legendary xian ("immortals") in Chinese mythology
- Immortels, the members of the Académie Française

== See also ==
- Immortal Guards (disambiguation)
- Inmortal (disambiguation)
- Immortel (disambiguation)
- Immortelle (disambiguation)
- The Immortals (disambiguation)
- Temple of the Five Immortals (disambiguation)
- Eight Immortals (disambiguation)
- Immortality in fiction, a popular subject in fiction
- List of people who have claimed to be immortal
