= The Immortals =

The Immortals may refer to:

== Literature ==
- The Immortals (poem), by Isaac Rosenburg (1918)
- The Immortals (Barjavel novel), a 1973 novel by René Barjavel
- The Immortals (Hickman novel), a 1996 novel by Tracy and Laura Hickman
- The Immortals (Pierce series), by Tamora Pierce
- The Immortals (Noël series), by Alyson Noël
- The Immortals (The Edge Chronicles), a 2009 novel in the Edge Chronicles series
- The Immortals (Gunn novel), a novel by James Gunn (author)
- A book series by Alyson Noel beginning with Evermore (novel)

== Music ==
- The Immortals (band), a Belgian band
- "The Immortals" (song), a 2011 song by American rock band Kings of Leon

== Other uses ==
- "The Immortals" (Cosmos: A Spacetime Odyssey), the eleventh episode of Cosmos: A Spacetime Odyssey
- The Immortals (1995 film), 1995 action/crime/drama film
- The Immortals (2015 film), 2015 Indian documentary film
- The Immortals (neo-nazis), a neo-Nazi organization
- "The Immortals" (NCIS), an episode of television series NCIS
- The Immortals (rugby league), an accolade bestowed by Rugby League Week magazine
- Immortals (Achaemenid Empire), an elite military unit of Ancient Persia
- Immortals (Byzantine Empire), an elite military unit of the Eastern Roman Empire

== See also ==
- Immortal (disambiguation)
