= Athanatoi =

Athanatoi (Ancient Greek: Ἀθάνατοι) or Athanati literally mean "immortals", and may refer to:

- Immortals (Achaemenid Empire)
- Immortals (Sasanian Empire)
- Immortals (Byzantine Empire)

== See also ==
- Immortal (disambiguation)
