= Battle of Kaskar =

634 battle of the Muslim conquest of Persia

- Part of Islamic conquest of Persia
Date	634 CE
Location	Kashkar, Asuristan (modern day Iraq)
Result	Muslim victory

Belligerents
Rashidun Caliphate	Sasanian Empire

Commanders and leaders
Abu Ubayd al-Thaqafi; Arfajah ibn Harthama	Narsi; Jalinus; Vinduyih; Tiruyih

Strength
Unknown	Unknown

Casualties and losses
Unknown	Unknown

The Battle of Kaskar (Arabic: معركة كسكر) was fought between the advancing forces of the Rashidun Caliphate and the Sasanian Empire in Asuristan (present-day Iraq). Following the Battle of Namaraq, the defeated Persian noblemen and the governor of Kaškar, Narsi, fled back to his estates in an attempt to save his life. The Muslims soon advanced towards his estate, however, and Narsi marched out to defend it. His flanks were commanded by the sons of Vistahm, Vinduyih and Tiruyih. Rostam Farrokhzad, another Persian nobleman, also sent the commander Jalinus to assist Narsi, but he did not arrive in time. In the ensuing battle, Narsi was soundly defeated; however, he and his commanders managed to escape. Jalinus soon met the Muslim force as well, but he too was defeated.

== Sources ==
- Pourshariati, Parvaneh (April 15, 2008). Decline and Fall of the Sasanian Empire: The Sasanian-Parthian Confederacy and the Arab Conquest of Iran. I. B. Tauris. p. 213. ISBN 978-1845116453.
