= Baxian (disambiguation) =

Baxian usually refers to the Eight Immortals (八仙; Bāxiān) in Chinese mythology.

Baxian may also refer to:

- Baxian, Shaanxi, a town in Pingli County, Shaanxi, China
- Baxian or Ba County, a former name of Bazhou City
- Baxian Tower, highest point of Mount Taibai

== See also ==
- Chen Baxian (503–559) or Emperor Wu of Chen
- Eight Immortals (disambiguation)
