= Battle of Buwaib =

635 battle

- Part of the Muslim conquest of Sassanid empire
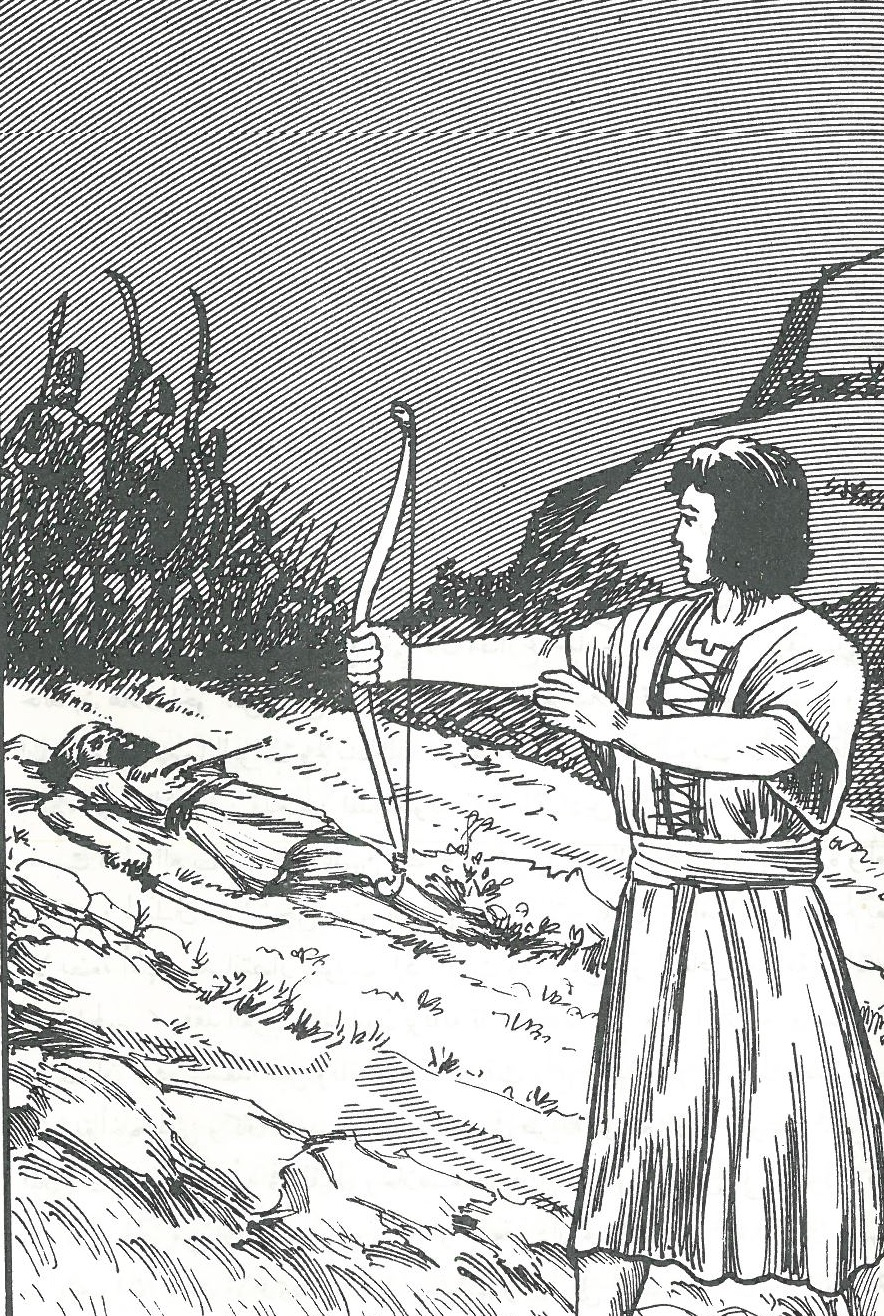
- Mihran bin Badhan's death in the battle, as portrayed in Tārīkhunā bi-uslūb qaṣaṣī (Our History in a Narrative style), published 1935
Date	April 635
Location	Buwaib (north of Al-Hira), Euphrates, Iraq
Result	Rashidun victory

Belligerents
Rashidun Caliphate (Rashidun army)	Sassanid Empire (Sassanid army)

Commanders and leaders
Al-Muthanna ibn Haritha	Mihran bin Badhan †

The Battle of Buwaib (Arabic: معركة البويب) was fought between the Sassanid Empire and the Rashidun Caliphate soon after the Battle of the Bridge.

== Prelude ==
The Battle of the Bridge was a decisive Sasanian victory which gave them a huge boost to expel invading Arabs from Mesopotamia. Thus, they advanced with a huge army to fight the remnants of the Muslim army near Kufa on the Euphrates.

Caliph Umar sent reinforcements to the region which were mainly the people who were fighting Muslims during the Ridda wars.

== Battle ==
Al-Muthanna ibn Haritha managed to force the upcoming Persian army to cross the river to a place where his soldiers, who were divided into brigades, could encircle their numerically superior opponents.

The war ended with a huge success for the Muslims, thanks in no small part to the help of local Christian Arab tribes who decided to help the Muslim army. According to Tabari, the Persian leader Mihran bin Badhan was killed by a slave, Jabir bin Abdullah, who belonged to the Taghlab tribe and two masters, Jarir and Ibn Hober (later, a dispute ensued between the masters regarding the sharing of Mehran's weapons and clothing which had to be resolved by Al-Muthanna). The Arabs gained the momentum to further expand their wars against the Sassanids and their allies.

== Historicity ==
Fred Donner, a scholar of Islam, considers the battle a fabrication as one of the major sources for the battle, Sayf ibn Umar, is known to have exaggerated at times.
