= Immortals (Sasanian Empire) =

Elite cavalry unit of the Sasanian Persian army

The Immortals was an elite cavalry unit of the army of the Sasanian Empire with the alleged size of 10,000 men, similar to the Achaemenid "Immortals" described by Herodotus. The name is derived from a term used by Roman historians to refer to the unit. Armenian and Islamic sources also have allusions to elite unit(s) in the Sasanian army.

== History ==
The "Immortals" (Greek: Ἀθάνατοι Athanatoi) is a name used by Roman historians of the Roman-Persian Wars to refer to an elite unit of the army of the Sasanian Empire. Some of these sources claim the unit was composed of 10,000 cavalrymen. The reported Greek name and the size of the force is identical to the "Immortals" infantry unit of the Achaemenid Empire described by Herodotus.

The name "Immortals" has been used by Greek-language works of Roman historians Procopius (describing the Battles of Thannuris and Dara), John Malalas (describing the Roman–Sasanian War of 421–422), Theophanes, and the lexicographer Hesychius, with the notable exception of Ammianus Marcellinus's Latin history book. Despite having first-hand encounters with Sasanian forces, Ammianus has not mentioned such name (which would have been Immortales in Latin), although he mentions regius equitatus to refer to a heavy cavalry force in his description of Julian's Persian War; this may be a Royal Guard unit, but not necessarily the "Immortals" mentioned by other Roman historians.

But no sooner had the first light of day appeared, than the glittering coats of mail, girt with bands of steel, and the gleaming cuirasses, seen from afar, showed that the king's forces were at hand.

— Ammianus Marcellinus

Armenian sources (including those describing the Battle of Avarayr) also contain allusions to such elite unit(s) mentioned by other Roman sources. Arabic sources of the Islamic period also mention elite forces during the Muslim conquest of Persia (for example, that of Jalinus).

According to one report, on one occasion during the Roman–Sasanian War of 421–422, the force attacked a Roman army, and although becoming outnumbered, they stood firm and were killed to the last man. Kaveh Farrokh calls the unit Zhayedan, writing in his Shadows in the Desert: Ancient Persia at War that they were used often against the Arabs in the 7th century (such as in the Battle of the Bridge and the Battle of al-Qādisiyyah).

According to Christensen (1944), the commander of the "Immortals" bore the title of varthraghnīghān khvadhāy.

Based on the phrase gund-n matean / matenik gund-n in Armenian sources, Chaumont (1973) reconstructed the Persian name for the unit "Immortals" as gund-i mādiyān, for which Henning (1942) proposed the meaning "the principal battalion", which was supported by Nyberg (1974), who reconstructed it as mātiyān i gund. However, NicoUe (1996) claimed the Persian name of the unit was Pushtighbansalar, but others consider the phrase to simply mean "commander of the royal guard".

Although modern historians of the twentieth century had accepted this description and interpreted it as a revival of the Achaemenid unit by the Sasanians, recent reinvestigations have doubted the simplified Roman description, based on the recent view of Touraj Daryaee (2006) (itself based on Ehsan Yarshater's theory) that the Sasanians had little knowledge of the specific institutions of their Achaemenid predecessors. Although there were probably such elite cavalry unit (or several such units in different time points throughout the Sasanian period), it is unlikely that it was a deliberate imitation of the Achaemenid unit described by Herodotus, and that the size of this elite force was as large as 10,000. The name "Immortals" mentioned by Roman historians was likely not derived from any official Sasanian name.

The Immortals are said to have used the tough and powerful Nisean horse, native to the Zagros Mountains of western Iran.

== In popular culture ==
- In the strategy game Rome Total War: Barbarian Invasion the Sasanians can use Immortals. They are known as "Clibanarii Immortals" and are the elite general bodyguard unit.
- In the strategy game Total War: Attila the Sasanians can use Zhayedan Immortals as Missile Cavalry.
- In the Empire Divided DLC for Total War: Rome II the Zhayedan Immortals are included in the Sasanians roster as elite melee cavalry.
- In the Sci-Fi tabletop wargame Infinity: The Game, the Haqqislam army has access to Zhayedan Intervention Troops. This unit has the ability to revive itself when unconscious by spending an order token and passing a dice roll.
- In the unofficial modification Minor Factions Revenge for the game Empire: Total War, the Safavid Persia can recruit Immortals as elite unit for infantry and cavalry.

== See also ==
- Aswaran
- Pushtigban
- Immortals (Byzantine Empire)
- Praetorian Guard
- Hazarbed
- Persian war elephants
- Battle of Callinicum
- Hephthalite–Sasanian War of 484
