= Ichor =

Blood of gods in Greek mythology

In Greek mythology, ichor (/ˈaɪkər/) is the ethereal fluid making up the blood of the gods and/or immortals. The Ancient Greek word ἰχώρ (ikhṓr) is of uncertain etymology, and has been suggested to be a foreign word, possibly the pre-Greek substrate.

== In classical myth ==
Ichor originates in Greek mythology, where it is the "ethereal fluid" that is the blood of the Greek gods, sometimes said to retain the qualities of the immortals' food and drink, ambrosia and nectar. Great heroes and demigods occasionally attacked gods and released ichor, but gods rarely did so to each other in Homeric myth.

According to G.S. Kirk, the term is used in the sense of "divine equivalent of blood" only twice, in the Homeric passages of the Iliad. The goddess Athena confers on Diomedes the ability to distinguish gods and mortals, and grants specific permission to wound Aphrodite. (Note: Iliad vv. 334–339, apud Heslin (2015).):

πρυμνὸν ὕπερ θέναρος· (Note: "root of the palm of the hand".) ῥέε δ’ ἄμβροτον αἷμα θεοῖο
ἰχώρ, οἷός πέρ τε ῥέει μακάρεσσι θεοῖσιν·
οὐ γὰρ σῖτον ἔδουσ’, οὐ πίνουσ’ αἴθοπα οἶνον,
τοὔνεκ’ ἀναίμονές εἰσι καὶ ἀθάνατοι καλέονται·

— Iliad vv. 339–342:
Translation:

[His spear.. struck Aphrodite at the base of her palm,] Blood [flowed], but immortal [blood at that]: ichor pure,
Such as the blessed inhabitants of heaven may bleed,
For the Gods eat not man's food,
Nor [drink sparkling] wine,
For they are bloodless and [called] death-exempt [Athanatoi, or "Immortals"]. (Note: The editor footnotes the scholium by J. de Villoison: "We are not to understand that the poet ascribes the immortality of the Gods to their abstinence from the drink and food of man, for most animals partake of neither, but the expression is elliptic and requires to be supplied thus – they drink not wine but nectar, eat not the food of mortals, but ambrosia; thence it is that they are bloodless and exempt from death.")

— Based on W. Cowper, modernized spellings.

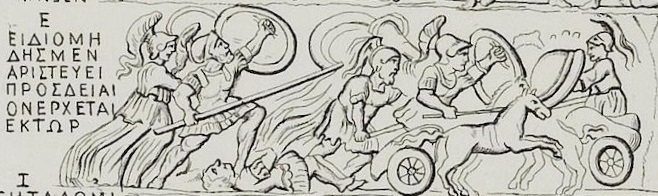
Scene from the Iliad in the Sarti tabula iliaca. Instigated by Athena (far left), Diomedes makes an upward attack. (Note: Pandarus's corpse lies on ground.) Aeneas holding sword is almost toppling, and Aphrodite (far right) hastens to help her son.

The scene where Diomedes with spear is on the verge of confronting and wounding Aphrodite is depicted on the Sarti tabula iliaca (cf. fig. right).

In the second passage shortly after in the Iliad where ichor recurs, Aphrodite (Dione) merely wipes the ichor (ἰχῶ, v. 416) with both her hands, and she is none the worse for wear. So despite the agony it carried, the wound inflicted by the mortal turned out to be but a slight one.

In Ancient Crete, tradition told of Talos, a giant man of bronze and ichor. Apollodotus explains that Talos had a single vein running from neck to ankle, pinned down by bronze nails. Talos encircled the island, guarding it, so that when the Argonauts arrived (having already acquired the Golden Fleece), Talos threw boulders at their ship. The sorceress Medea defeated it by either driving it to madness with drugs, or falsely promising to give it immortality, and pulling out the nail (presumably the lower one at the ankle) draining out all its ichor. In Apollonius of Rhodes's account, Talos nicked its ankle on a crag and the precious ichor gushed out like molten lead.

Prometheus was a Titan, who made humans and stole fire from the gods and gave it to the mortals, and consequently was punished by Zeus for all eternity. Prometheus was chained to a rock for his sin, and his liver was eaten daily by an eagle. His liver would then regrow, just to be eaten again, repeated for all eternity. Prometheus bled ichor, a blood-like substance that would cause a magical herb to sprout when it touched the ground (cf. connection to mandrake lore):

It [a magical herb] first appeared in a plant that sprang from the blood-like ichor of Prometheus in his torment, which the flesh-eating Eagle had dropped on the spurs of the Kaukasos.

== As allusion ==
Because Alexander the Great fashioned himself as a son of god, once when he received injury that drew blood, the grappler Dioxippus told the king "That is 'ichor', such as flows in the veins of the blessed gods", according to Aristobulus of Cassandreia (Note: Aristobulus fr. 47=Athen. Vi, 251A. apud Tarn (1979).) Plutarch in Parallel Lives has the king himself say "This, you see, is blood, and not 'ichor', etc.". (Note: Plutarch. Alexander xxviii, apud Tarn (1979).)

== Later uses ==
In pathology, "ichor" is an antiquated term for a watery discharge from a wound or ulcer, with an unpleasant or fetid (offensive) smell.

The Greek Christian writer Clement of Alexandria deliberately confounded ichor in its medical sense as a foul-smelling watery discharge from a wound or ulcer with its mythological sense as the blood of the gods, in a polemic against the Greek gods. As part of his evidence that they are merely mortal, he cites several cases in which the gods are wounded physically, and then asserts that

if there are wounds, there is blood. For the ichor of the poets is more repulsive than blood; for the putrefaction of blood is called ichor.

Petrichor was coined in the twentieth Century after πέτρα, meaning 'rock' or 'stone', and ichor.

== See also ==
- Blood of Christ
- Ectoplasm (paranormal)
