= Immortel =

Immortel may refer to:

- Immortels, see List of members of the Académie française
- Immortel (ad vitam), a 2004 English-language, French-produced science fiction film, based upon the graphic novel La Foire aux immortels (The Carnival of Immortals)
- "Immortel" (song), a 2020 song by French singer Gims
- L'Immortel, or 22 Bullets, a 2010 French film by Richard Berry

== See also ==
- Immortal (disambiguation)
- Immortality
- Immortelle (disambiguation)
