= Immortelle =

Immortelle is another name for everlastings, plants in the family Asteraceae. It may also refer to:

== Plants ==
- Erythrina fusca, found in tropical and subtropical regions
- Helichrysum arenarium, found in Eurasia
- Helichrysum italicum, found in southern Europe
- Xeranthemum annuum, found in Eurasia

== Other uses ==
- Immortelle, an album by Dew-Scented
- Immortelle, an album by Say Lou Lou
- "Immortelle" (song), by Lara Fabian (2001)
- Immortelle (cemetery), artificial and hence long-lasting flowers placed on graves
- L'Immortelle, a 1963 French-Turkish film

== See also ==
- Immortel (disambiguation)
