= Inmortal =

Inmortal may refer to:

- "Inmortal" (Aventura song)
- "Inmortal" (Erreway song)
- "Inmortal" (La Oreja de Van Gogh song)
- Inmortal, an album by Gloria Trevi
- Inmortal, an album by DJ Nelson and Alberto Stylee

== See also ==
- Immortal (disambiguation)
