= Immortal (comics) =

Immortal, in comics, may refer to:

- Immortal (Image Comics), an Image Comics superhero character
- Immortal (webcomic), a 2006 webcomic by Dean Haspiel
- Immortal, a DC Comics character who appeared in Justice League International

It may also refer to:

- A Bedlam of Immortals, a French science fiction graphic novel
- Arion the Immortal. a series from DC Comics starring Arion, Lord of Atlantis
- Blade of the Immortal, a manga series from Hiroaki Samura
- The Immortal Hulk, a Marvel Comics superhero
- The Immortal Iron Fist, a Marvel Comics martial arts superhero series
- Immortal Man, a DC Comics superhero
- Immortalis, the name used by Mortigan Goth in the Marvel UK series Mortigan Goth: Immortalis
- Immortal Two, a 1997 series from Image Comics
- Immortal Weapons, a Marvel Comics spin-off group and mini-series from Iron Fist
- Mister Immortal, a Marvel Comics superhero
- The Immortal, one of the Guardians of the Globe from the comic and subsequent TV series Invincible

== See also ==
- Immortal (disambiguation)
