= Immortal Guards =

Immortal Guards may refer to:

- The Persian Immortals, existing in Persia under the Achaemenean dynasty
- Immortals (Byzantine Empire), established under the Byzantine emperor Michael VII
- The Immortals, the Iranian Imperial Guard, existing in Persia and Iran in the 20th century under the Pahlavi dynasty
- The Immortals, Nihang warriors or Sikh Akalis who have played the pivotal role in Sikh military history

== See also ==
- Imperial Guard (Napoleon I), elite French soldiers under Napoleon I nicknamed "the Immortals"
