= Al-Muthanna ibn Haritha =

7th-century Muslim Arab general

- المثنى بن حارثة الشيباني
- Military career
- Rank: General
- Conflicts: Battle of Ullais; Battle of Walaja; Battle of Babylon (634); Battle of Namaraq; Battle of the Bridge; Battle of Buwaib; Battle of al-Qadisiyyah

Al-Muthanna ibn Haritha al-Shaybani (Arabic: المثنى بن حارثة الشيباني) was a Muslim Arab general in the army of the Rashidun Caliphate.

== Career ==
Al-Muthanna was a commander of the Muslim Arabs in al-Hira, from which they were conducting raids in the plains of Sasanian Mesopotamia. He asked Abu Bakr for reinforcements against the Sasanians, as they started fighting back. As Umar became caliph, he dispatched a force under Abu Ubayd al-Thaqafi, who took over command from al-Muthanna for the second time. In the upcoming battle at the coast of the Euphrates river, known as the Battle of the Bridge, Abu Ubayd was killed and the Arab Muslims were defeated, but al-Muthanna, although wounded, survived with 3,000 soldiers who deserted to Medina and elsewhere in the Arabian desert. In 634, al-Muthanna led his army to defeat the Persians in Battle of Buwaib.

He was among the commanders at the Battle of al-Qādisiyyah in 636. In the same year, after the capture of Persian territory in Iraq by Muslim Arab forces and the departure of Khalid ibn al-Walid, al-Muthanna was put in charge of the Muslim Arab occupied territories of Iraq. Al-Muthanna relied on his tribe, the Banu Bakr along with other powerful Arab tribes including the Taghlib and the Tamim to maintain control over the territories.

== Legacy ==
Due to his victory he became a celebrated historical figure in modern Iraq. His name was used as a title by the pan-Arab nationalist political movement called the al-Muthanna Club. His name was also given to the Muthanna Province in the south of the country and is mentioned in the former Iraqi national anthem, which was used from 1981 to 2003.

== Sources ==
- Ghareeb, Edmund; Dougherty, Beth (2004). Historical Dictionary of Iraq. Lanham, Maryland, USA; Oxford, England, UK: Scarecrow Press. ISBN 978-0-8108-4330-1. OCLC 474387358.
