= Jalinus =

Sasanian general

- Died: November 636 al-Qadisiyyah
- Military career
- Allegiance: Sasanian Empire
- Conflicts: Battle of Kaskar; Battle of the Bridge; Battle of al-Qadisiyyah †

Jalinus (Arabic: جالينوس, romanized: Jālīnūs, also جالنوس Jālinūs or جيلنوس Jīlinūs) was a 7th-century Sasanian military leader. He may have been of Armenian noble origin. He was reportedly the commander of the ruler's personal guard and was tasked with guarding Khosrow II during the latter's imprisonment. He was one of the commanders of the Sasanian army during the Arab conquest of Iran and was killed at the Battle of al-Qadisiyyah in 636.

== Background and identity ==
The name of Jalinus appears to be the Arabic form of a Greek name. C. E. Bosworth supposes that he was Christian who had adopted a Christian name in addition to his Persian name, which remains unknown. According to Parvaneh Pourshariati, the name was most likely not his personal name but rather a title. In Pourshariati's view, he was probably a member of one of the Armenian noble dynasties that played an important role in the Sasanian Empire at that time. He may have been the same person as Mushegh III Mamikonian or Gregory of Siwnik, who both also served the Sasanians in the early 7th century and fell at the Battle of al-Qadisiyyah.

== Biography ==
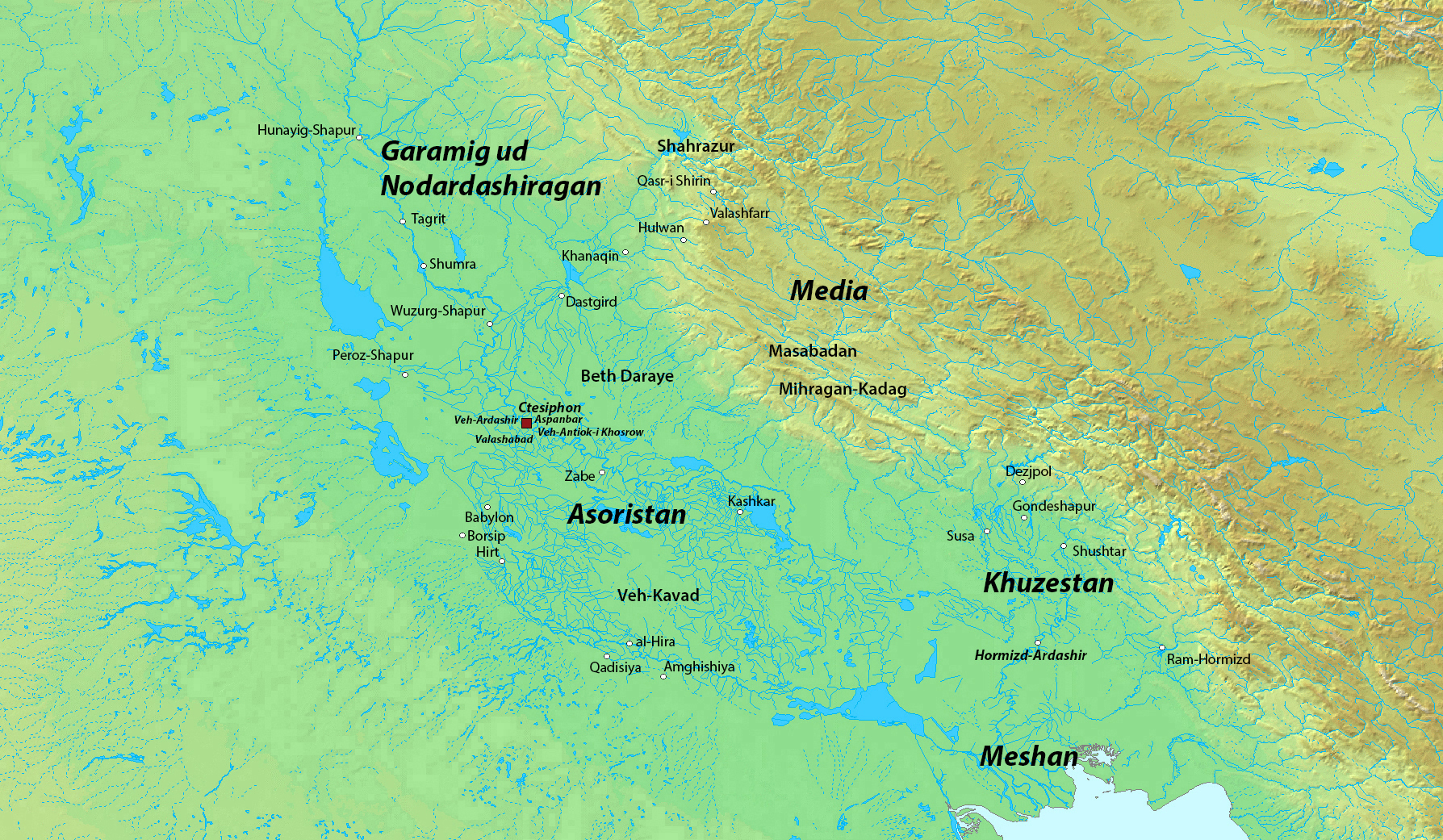
Map of Sasanian Mesopotamia and its surroundings.

Jalinus is mentioned by al-Tabari as the commander of the guard tasked with guarding Khosrow II during the latter's imprisonment in 628. Pourshariati suggests that this reflects the involvement of an Armenian faction in the conspiracy against Khosrow. Although Khosrow had been overthrown and imprisoned by his son Kavad II Sheroe, he was still treated like a monarch, with Jalinus even addressing him with the formula anōšag buwād ('may he be immortal'). Jalinus is mentioned by Abu Hanifa Dinawari as the commander of the ruler's personal guard, called the gyān-abespārān 'those who sacrifice their lives' (rendered al-jund al-mustamitah 'the troops that seek death' in Arabic). Later, he was sent by Rostam Farrokhzad and Queen Boran at the head of an army to assist Narsi at Kaskar but arrived too late and was himself defeated by the forces of Abu Ubayd. After this defeat, Rostam placed Jalinus under the command of Bahman Jadhuyih, who, according to al-Tabari, was ordered to kill Jalinus if he were to fail again in battle. The forces of Jalinus and Bahman then defeated the Arabs at the Battle of the Bridge. Jalinus was one of the Sasanian commanders at the Battle of al-Qadisiyyah. According to al-Tabari, the Sasanian armies retreated after Rostam was killed in battle, then stopped at al-Kharrarah. Arab horsemen caught up with them, and Jalinus was killed.

== Sources ==
- Al-Ṭabarī (1999). The History of al-Ṭabarī, Volume V: The Sāsānids, the Byzantines, the Lakmids, and Yemen. Translated by C. E. Bosworth. Albany, NY: SUNY Press. ISBN 9780791443552.
- Al-Ṭabarī (1992). The History of al-Ṭabarī, Volume XII: The Battle of al-Qādisiyyah and the Conquest of Syria and Palestine. Translated by Yohanan Friedmann. Albany, NY: SUNY Press. ISBN 9780791407332.
- Pourshariati, Parvaneh (2008). Decline and Fall of the Sasanian Empire: The Sasanian-Parthian Confederacy and the Arab Conquest of Iran. London and New York: I.B. Tauris. ISBN 978-1-84511-645-3.
