= Cynthia Clawson =

American singer

- Born: Cynthia Dee Clawson; October 11, 1948 (age 77)
- Origin: Houston, Texas, US
- Genres: CCM, worship, gospel
- Occupations: Musician, songwriter, composer
- Years active: 1970s–present
- Website: www.cynthiaclawson.com

Cynthia Clawson (born October 11, 1948, in Houston, Texas) is a Grammy Award-winning American gospel singer. She has been called "The most awesome voice in gospel music" by Billboard Magazine, and has received five Dove Awards, 15 Dove Award nominations, and a Grammy for her work.

== Biographical information ==
Clawson is the daughter of Reverend and Mrs. Tom Clawson. She was 3 years old when her father asked her to sing in the small church of which he was the minister. From that time, she sang in local neighborhood churches and in Robert Schuller's Hour of Power. She has a sister, Patti Clawson, a pianist who sometimes accompanies her in concerts.

Clawson graduated from Milby High School in Houston, and is a 1970 graduate of Howard Payne University with a major in vocal performance and a minor in piano. She won the Arthur Godfrey Talent Show her senior year in college.

== Career ==
=== Television ===
Clawson was spotted by a CBS television producer who signed her to headline a summer 1971 replacement for The Carol Burnett Show called the CBS Newcomers. That show led her to a recording contract with record producer Buryl Red. Around that time, Buryl was writing a new musical with lyricist, poet and playwright Ragan Courtney titled Celebrate Life; Clawson was invited to record the solos for the original cast album.

Her other TV appearances include Get Together With James Robison, The Lawrence Welk Show, Arthur Godfrey's All American College Show and the Hour of Power Christian television program.

=== Recordings ===
In 1981, her recording of "The Lord's Prayer" with Andrae Crouch, The Archers (Janice Archer, Steve Archer, Tim Archer), B.J. Thomas, Dony McGuire, Reba Rambo, Tramaine Hawkins & Walter Hawkins won the Grammy Award for the Best Gospel Performance, Contemporary Or Inspirational category. She performed on the Grammy show that year.

In 1985, Clawson's rendition of "Softly and Tenderly" was included in the soundtrack of the Academy Award winning movie The Trip to Bountiful. In 1992, she recorded "Somewhere in Between" on the soundtrack of "Where the Red Fern Grows: Part 2". In 2014, Clawson recorded the closing song "You Are Home" for the original score soundtrack of the movie "Heaven is Real.

As of 2018, she has appeared on twenty Gaither Homecoming videos.

=== Concerts ===
In 1986, Clawson was featured in Lou Rawls Parade of Stars, along with The Judds, New Edition, Bill Cosby, Charlton Heston, and Natalie Cole. In later years, she became closely associated with Bill and Gloria Gaither and frequently sang with them in their Gaither Homecoming recordings and concerts. She has sung in a variety of prestigious venues, including a concert at London's Wembley Stadium.

In the early 1990s, she performed in a one-woman show, A Private Showing/A Public Confession, which was written for her.

Cynthia has performed regularly as a guest artist for Conspirare, a Texas-based a capella choral ensemble with eight Grammy nominations, as well as with the Houston Chamber Choir.

=== Evangelistic efforts ===
In 1970, Clawson and the musical group, The Lively Ones from Baylor University, accompanied evangelist Billie Hanks on a tour of five Asian countries in cooperation with the Foreign Mission Board of the Southern Baptist Convention. In 1972, she was featured soloist for the Meet Jesus Youth Crusade in Kerrville, Texas.

=== Composing ===
Clawson and Courtney have produced several musical works, including Bright New Wings, through their collaboration.

== Honors ==
Clawson was awarded an honorary degree of Doctor of Humane Letters from Houston Baptist University in 1995, and was awarded the same degree from Howard Payne University in 2007.

== Family ==
Clawson and Courtney were married in 1973. They were co-ministers of The Sanctuary in Austin, Texas, where they designed worship services using theatre and music as a means of religious expression.

Clawson has a son, Will, and a daughter, Lily. Lily graduated from the University of Texas at Austin with a degree in Religious Studies and is a Family Therapist-based out of Santa Fe. Will and Lily released their own Indie rock CD called Brothers and Sisters, and Will currently tours, writes and records on his own.

== Discography ==
- One in the Spirit (1971)
- In The Garden (1974)
- A Private Showing (1975)
- The Way I Feel (1977, reissue 2005)
- It Was His Love (1979)
- You're Welcome Here (1981, reissue 2005)
- Finest Hour (1982, reissue 2005)
- Forever (1983 reissue 2005)
- Immortal (1986, reissue 2005)
- Hymnsinger (1988)
- Carolsinger (1989)
- Words Will Never Do (1990)
- Cynthia's Greatest Hits (1991)
- Blessed Assurance: Songs My Grandmother Taught Me (1993)
- River of Memories (1994)
- Prayers and Plainsong (1995)
- Smoke on the Mountain (1998)
- Broken: Healing the Heart (1999)
- Carols and Chant (2005)
- See Me, God (2006)
- Episodes (2008)
- Always (2009)

== Awards ==
- 1980 Dove award Female Vocalist of the Year
- 1981 Dove award Female Vocalist of the Year
- 1981 Dove Award Inspirational Album of the Year—You're Welcome Here
- 1981 Dove Award Recorded Music Packaging of the Year—You're Welcome Here
- 1981 Grammy Award Best Gospel Performance, Contemporary Or Inspirational--"The Lord's Prayer"
- 1982 Dove Award Recorded Music Packaging of the Year—Finest Hour
- 2005 Texas Gospel Music Hall of Fame (July 2005)
