= White elephant (animal) =

Rare kind of elephant

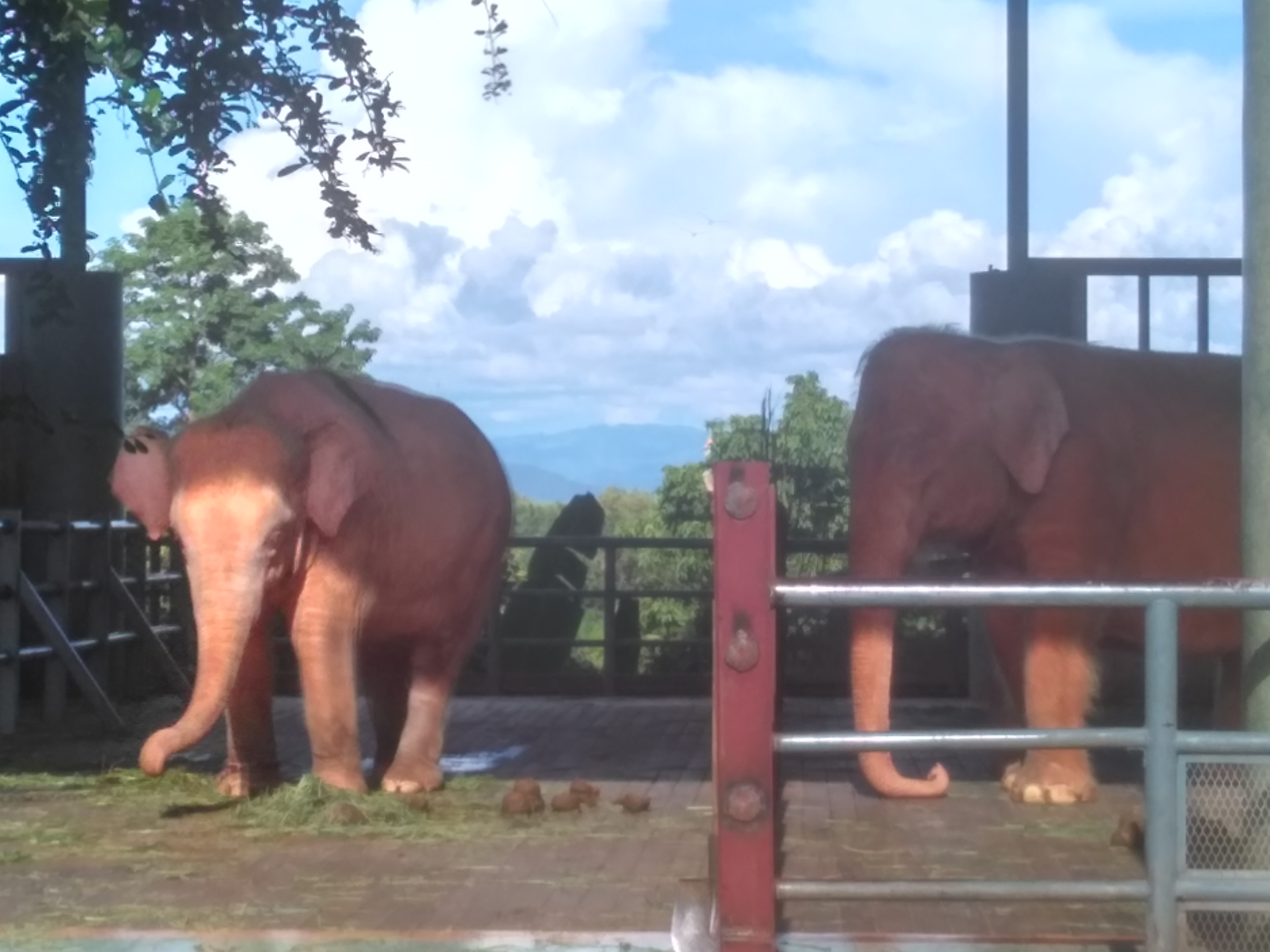
White elephants in Myanmar

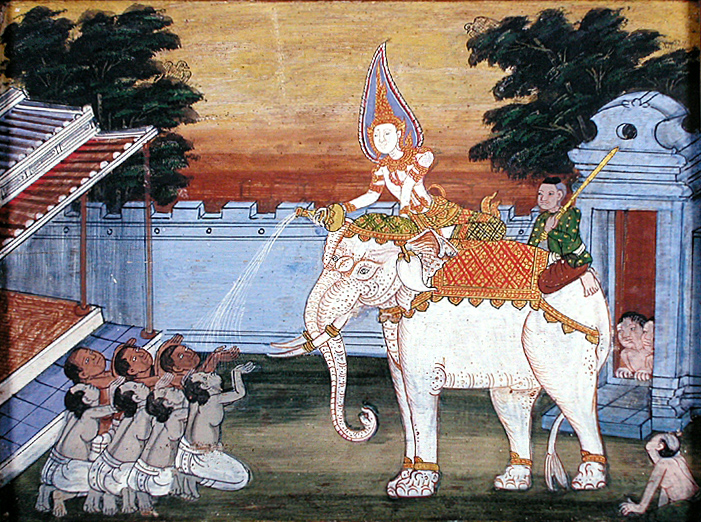
A royal white elephant, as depicted in a Thai painting

A white elephant (also albino elephant) is a rare kind of elephant, but not a distinct species. Although often depicted as snow white, their skin is typically a soft reddish-brown, turning a light pink when wet. They have fair eyelashes and toenails. The traditional "white elephant" is commonly misunderstood as being albino, but the Thai term, chang samkhan, translates as 'auspicious elephant', being "white" in terms of an aspect of purity.

As of 2023, Myanmar had ten white elephants. The king of Thailand also keeps a number of white elephants, eleven of which were still alive as of 2016.

== Religious significance ==
=== Hinduism ===
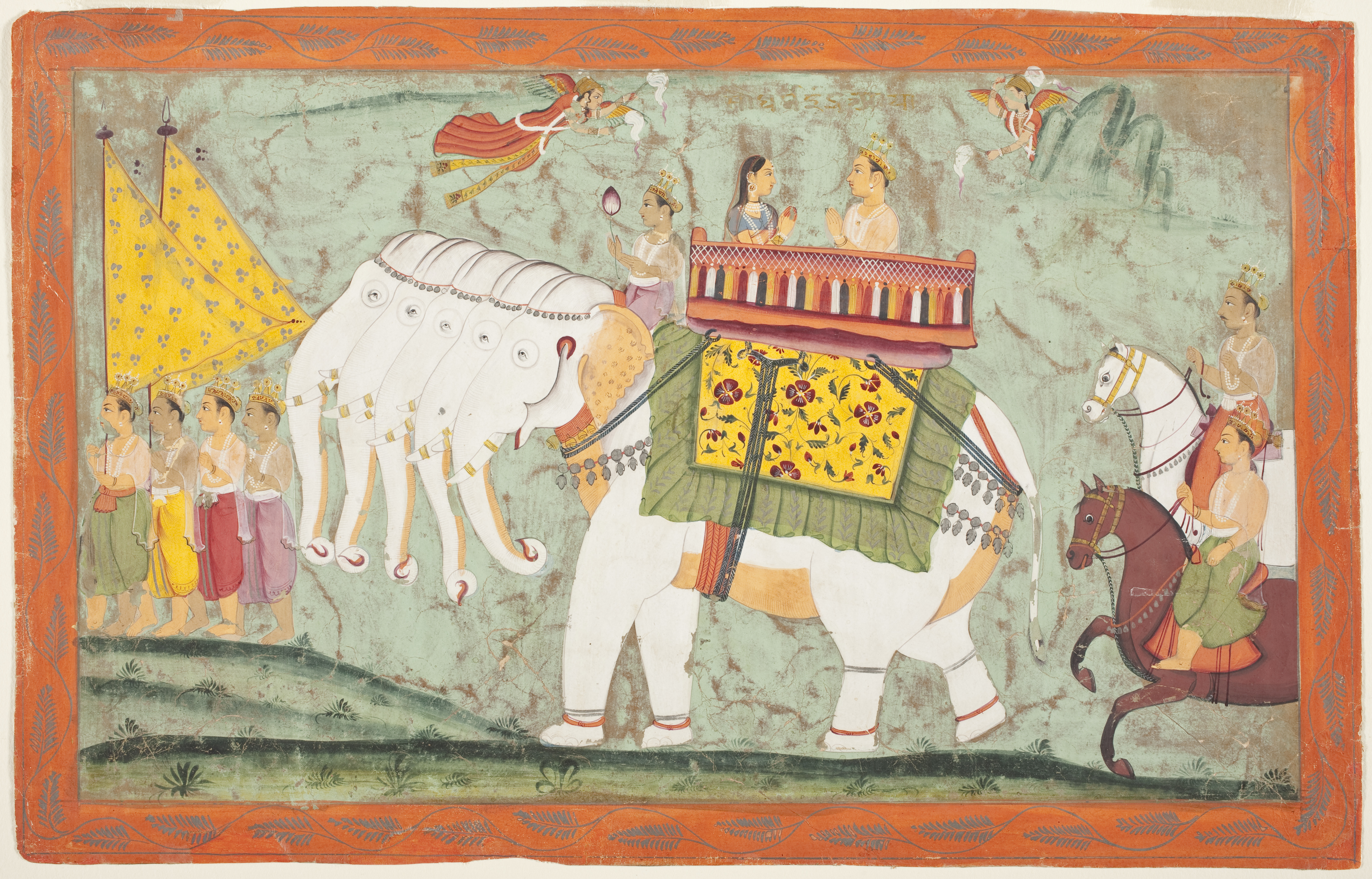
Indra and Sachi riding the five-headed divine elephant Airavata, folio from a Jain text, c. 1670–1680, painting in LACMA museum, originally from Amber, Rajasthan.

In Hindu puranas, the vehicle or mount of god Indra (Sakra in the Buddhist pantheon) is the white elephant named Airāvata, which possesses the ability to fly. Airāvata emerged when the universe was created by the churning of the Ocean of Milk by the demons and the gods. Consequently, Airāvata is depicted as a sacred white elephant, typically with four tusks in India and sometimes with five heads in Southeast Asia. The white elephant is referred to as Shrī Gāja (lit. 'elephant of Shrī'), Megha (lit. 'cloud'), or Gāja Lakshmī (lit. 'Lakshmī of the Elephants') when worshipped as a divine being.

King Bimbisara had a white elephant, which he had captured in a forest when the elephant was in his musth period. He named the bull elephant Sechanaka, which means "watering", as the elephant used to water the plants by himself without any prior training. It is said the cost of this elephant was more the half of Magadha. He later gave it to his son Vihallakumara, which made his other son Ajatashatru jealous. Ajatashatru tried to steal it many times, which resulted in two of the most terrible wars, called the Mahasilakantaka & Ratha-musala.

=== Buddhism ===
The white elephant also holds significance in the story of The Buddha's conception and birth. According to the story of the Buddha's conception, on the night Siddhartha was conceived, Queen Maya dreamt that a white elephant with six white tusks entered her right side. From this dream, soothsayers predicted that the child would be born a Buddha or a chakravarti (universal ruler).

== Historical significance ==
The Royal Seal of the Kingdom of Laos featured Airavata, the mount of Sakka.

In the Buddhist kingdoms of Southeast Asia, the white elephant was closely linked with Buddhist cosmology, because of the white elephant's close association with Sakka (cf. Śakra), the chief deva of Mount Meru, and the concept of kingship, namely the ideal 'universal monarch' (chakkavatti, cf. chakravarti) and 'righteous king' (dhammaraja; cf. dharmaraja). Thus, the possession of a white elephant symbolised kingship in mainland Southeast Asian kingdoms. Competition for white elephants drove royal courts to wage war with each other. The most prominent of such wars were the so-called 'elephant wars' between Thai and Burmese kingdoms. Between the 1500s to 1700s, Ayutthaya fought numerous wars with the Taungoo, Restored Taungoo, and Konbaung kingdoms. Arakanese and Burmese monarchs adopted the title 'lord of white elephants.' The discovery and receipt of white elephants by royal courts featured prominently in indigenous chronicles.

== Myanmar ==
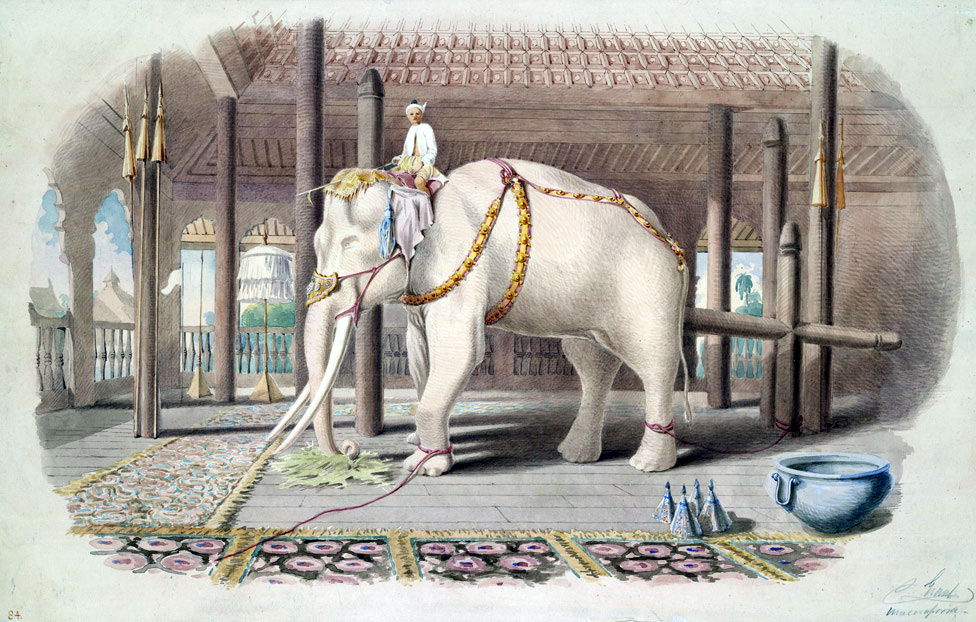
A white elephant at the Amarapura Palace in 1855

In Myanmar (Burma), white elephants, called hsinphyudaw (Burmese: ဆင်ဖြူတော်, lit. 'royal white elephant'), have historically been revered as good omens, and as symbols of power and good fortune. In the pre-colonial era, the discovery of a white elephant was considered a cosmic endorsement of the reigning monarch. They are traditionally graded based on characteristics called kyan-in lekkhana (ကြန်အင်လက္ခဏာ), including their tusks, back, ears, eyes, toenails, skin, and tail.

As of 2023, Myanmar possesses ten captive white elephants, which are in the custody of the Ministry of Natural Resources and Environmental Conservation's Forest Department. Three white elephants are currently held in a pavilion near the Kyauktawgyi Buddha Temple in Yangon. The rest are kept at Uppatasanti Pagoda in Naypyidaw, the national capital. The captivity of white elephants has been criticised by observers, including historian Than Tun. Burmese white elephants are kept in inhumane conditions, shackled for 22 hours a day and housed in small open-air pavilions.

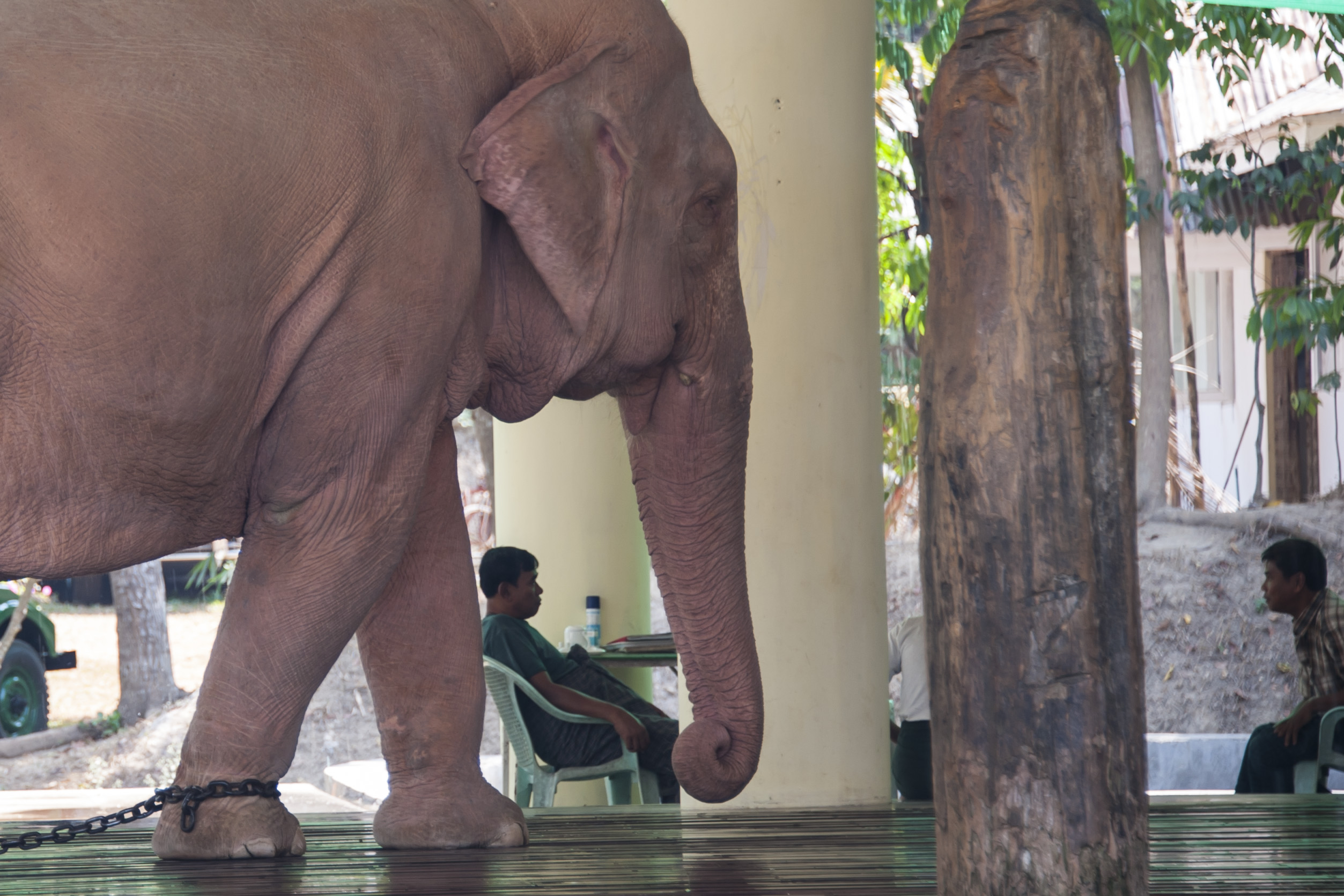
A white elephant outside of Yangon in 2013

The ruling military regime has repeatedly announced the discovery of white elephants, to bolster support for their regime, and by extension, their political legitimacy and hpone.

In 2009, the military regime began printing 5000 Myanmar kyat banknotes that feature an image of a white elephant, widely seen as an act of yadaya.

In 2013, Thai prime minister Surapong Tovichakchaikul asked the Burmese government to temporarily lend a white elephant and house it at Chiang Mai Zoo for 6 months, in order to mark 65 years of bilateral relations between the two countries. The Burmese government rejected the request, citing logistical challenges.

On 24 July 2022, a white elephant named Raṭṭhanandaka was born in Taungup Township, Rakhine State. Special postage stamps and gold commemorative coins featuring the elephant were produced to mark the 2023 Independence Day celebrations.

Below is a list of captive white elephants in Myanmar:

- Rājāgahasīripaccayagajarājā (ရာဇာဂဟသီရိပစ္စယဂဇရာဇာ) – a male discovered on 20 January 2000; 26 years ago in Rathedaung Township, Rakhine State
- Siṅgīmālā (သိင်္ဂီမာလာ) – a female discovered on 28 January 2002; 24 years ago in Maungdaw Township, Rakhine State
- Ratīmālā (ရတီမာလာ) – a female discovered on 18 July 2002; 24 years ago in Maungdaw District, Rakhine State
- Bhaddavatī (ဘဒ္ဒဝတီ, lit. 'endowed with goodness') – a female discovered on 26 June 2010; 16 years ago in Maungdaw Township, Rakhine State
- Nandavatī (နန္ဒဝတီ) – a female discovered on 23 September 2010; 16 years ago in Maungdaw Township, Rakhine State
- Ngwe Saddan (ငွေဆဒ္ဒန်) – a male discovered on 15 October 2011; 15 years ago in Maungdaw Township, Rakhine State
- Hemavatī (ဟေမဝတီ) – a female discovered on 25 October 2011; 15 years ago in Ngwesaung, Ayeyarwady Region
- Jātakalyā (ဇာတကလျာ) – a female discovered on 27 November 2011; 14 years ago in Naypyidaw
- Sīrimālā (သီရိမာလာ) – a female discovered on 27 February 2015; 11 years ago in Pathein Township, Ayeyarwady Region
- Raṭṭhanandaka (ရဋ္ဌနန္ဒက, lit. 'country's happiness') – a male born on 24 July 2022; 4 years ago in Taungup Township, Rakhine State

== Persia ==
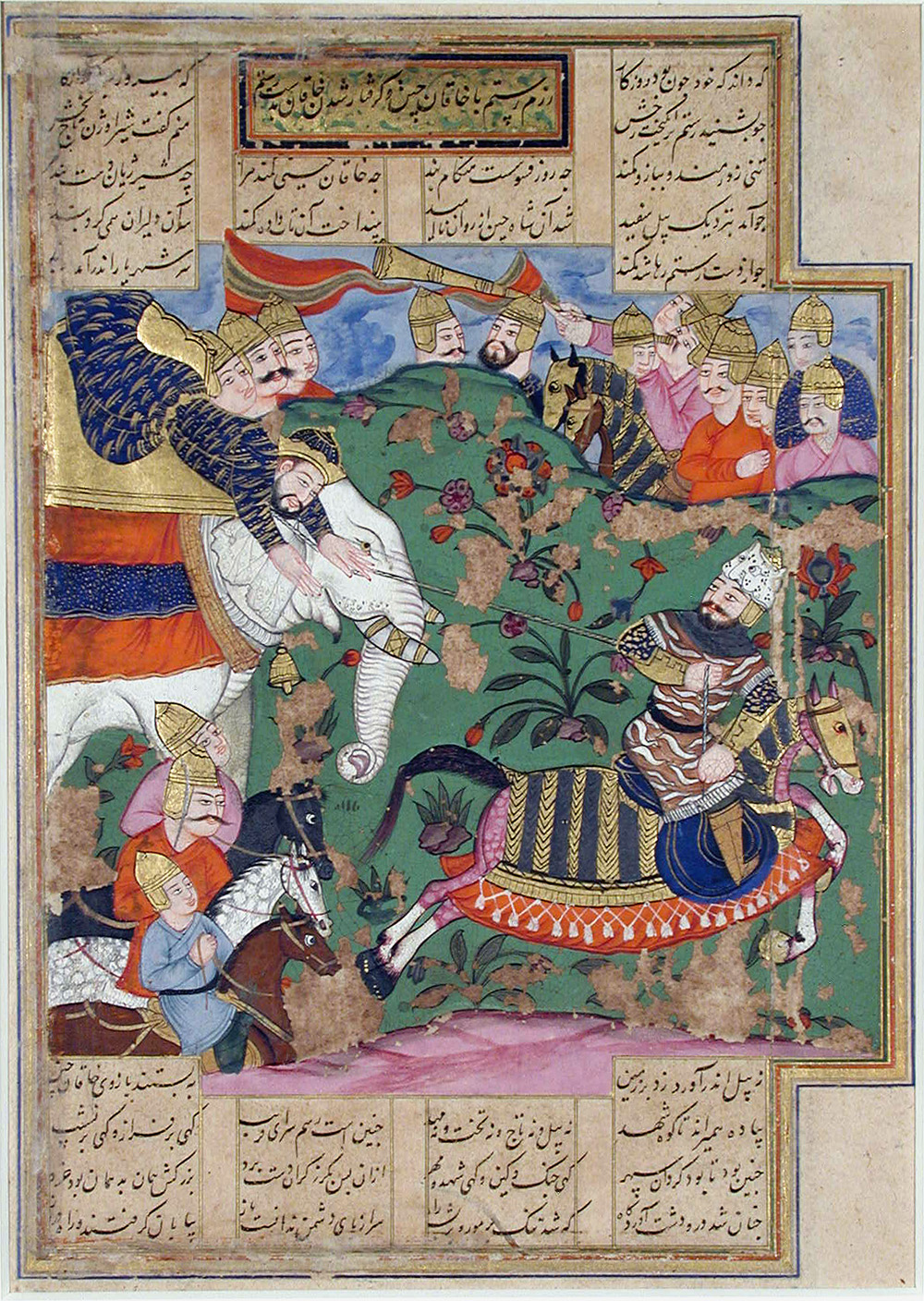
Rostam Dragging the Khaqan of China from His White Elephant, Persian miniature from Shahnama

There were white elephants in the army of the Sasanian king Khusrau II. According to al-Tabari, a white elephant killed the commander of the Arab Muslims Abu Ubayd al-Thaqafi in the Battle of the Bridge. White elephants were considered royalty by Arabs and served as mounts for caliphs. Abul-Abbas, a white elephant was gifted to Charlemagne by Harun al-Rashid, the fifth Abbasid caliph.

== Thailand ==
"The white elephant flag", flag of Siam in 1855–1916

"According to Brahmanic belief, if a monarch possessed one or more 'white' elephants, it was a glorious and happy sign." King Trailok possessed the first. In the Thai language, they are called albino, not white, indicating "pale yellow eyes and white nails", with white hair. The "rough skin was either pink all over or had pink patches on the head, trunk, or forelegs." "They were not worshipped for themselves and were regarded as an appendage to the King's majesty."

In Thailand, white elephants (ช้างเผือก, chang phueak) are considered sacred and are a symbol of royal power; all those discovered are presented to the king (although this presentation is usually a ceremonial one; the elephants are not taken into captivity). Historically, the status of kings has been evaluated by the number of white elephants in their possession. The late king Bhumibol Adulyadej owned as many as 21 white elephants; considered an unprecedented achievement, making him the monarch who owned the greatest number of chang phueak in Thai history. The first elephant found in King Bhumibol's reign was regarded as the most important elephant in the whole realm; it received a royal title which bears his majesty's own name: Phra Savet Adulyadej Pahol Bhumibol Navanatta-parami (พระเศวตอดุลยเดชพาหล ภูมิพลนวนาถบารมี). However, the King did not bestow royal titles to all of the white elephants in his possession. As of 2016, eleven of these elephants are still alive and only five have royal titles.

A white elephant in Thailand is not necessarily albino, although it must have pale skin. After being discovered, the elephants are assigned to one of four graded categories before being offered to the king, although the lower grades are sometimes refused.

In the past, lower grade white elephants were given as gifts to the king's friends and allies. The animals needed a great deal of care and, being sacred, could not be put to work, so were a great financial burden on the recipient; only the monarch and the very rich could afford them. According to one story, white elephants were sometimes given as a present to some enemy (often a lesser noble with whom the king was displeased). The unfortunate recipient, unable to make any profit from it, and obliged to take care of it, would suffer bankruptcy and ruin.

Thailand has awarded the Order of the White Elephant to civil servants since 1861.

== Africa ==
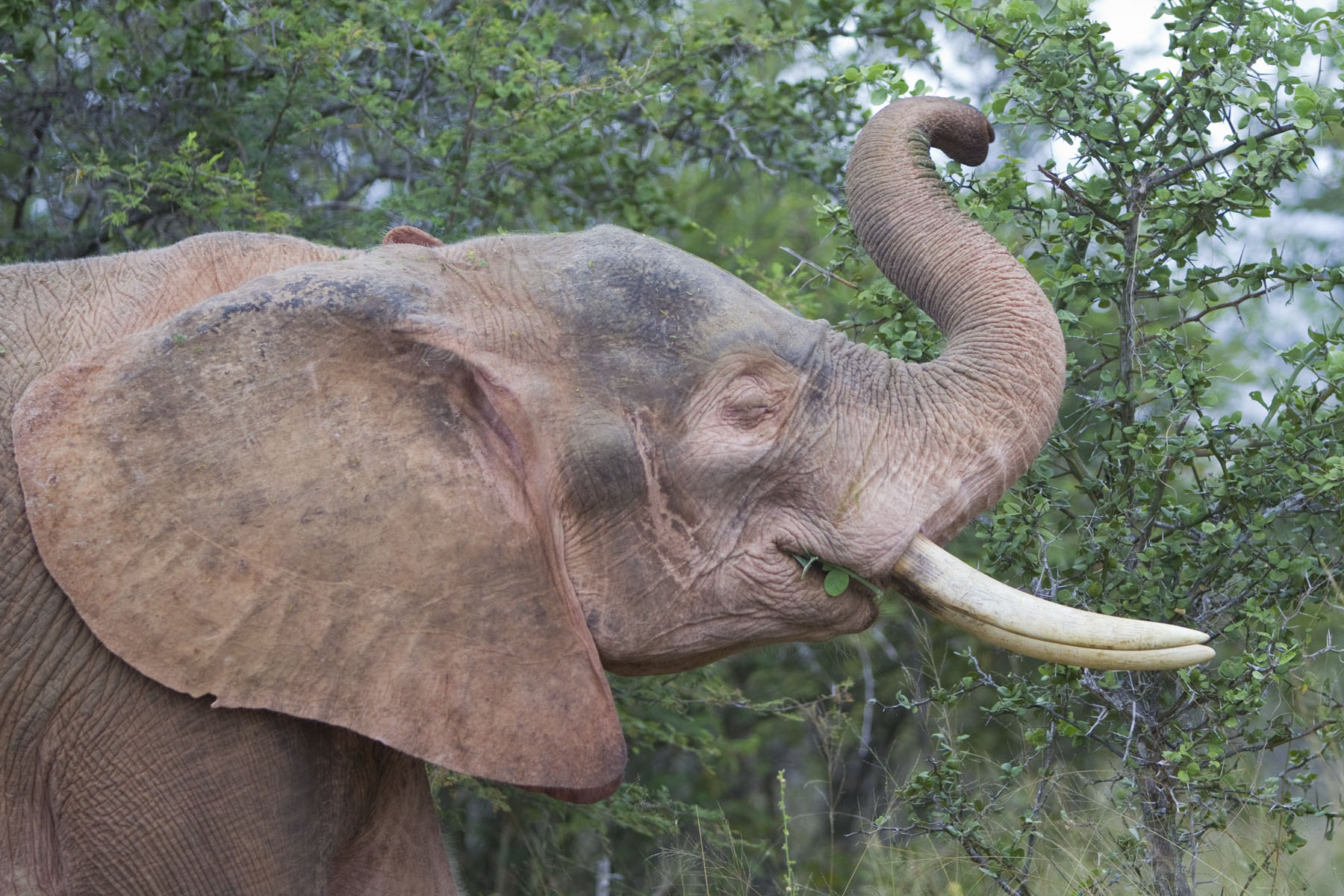
An albino elephant from Kruger National Park, South Africa

Albinos are much rarer among African elephants than in Asia. They are reddish-brown or pink, and may suffer blindness or skin problems from sun exposure.

See also Pink elephant spotted in Botswana at Wikinews

== Western cultural references ==
In English, the term "white elephant" has come to mean a spectacular and prestigious thing that is more trouble than it is worth, or has outlived its usefulness to the person who has it. While the item may be useful to others, its current owner would usually be glad to be rid of it.

== See also ==
- Abul-Abbas, a (possibly) white elephant given to Charlemagne by Harun al-Rashid
- Airavata, a white elephant whom the god Indra rides
- Hanno, the pet of Pope Leo X
- Seeing pink elephants, a euphemistic term for visual hallucination arising from alcohol intoxication
- White elephant gift exchange, a popular winter holiday party game in the U.S.
