= Persian war elephants =

Military animal

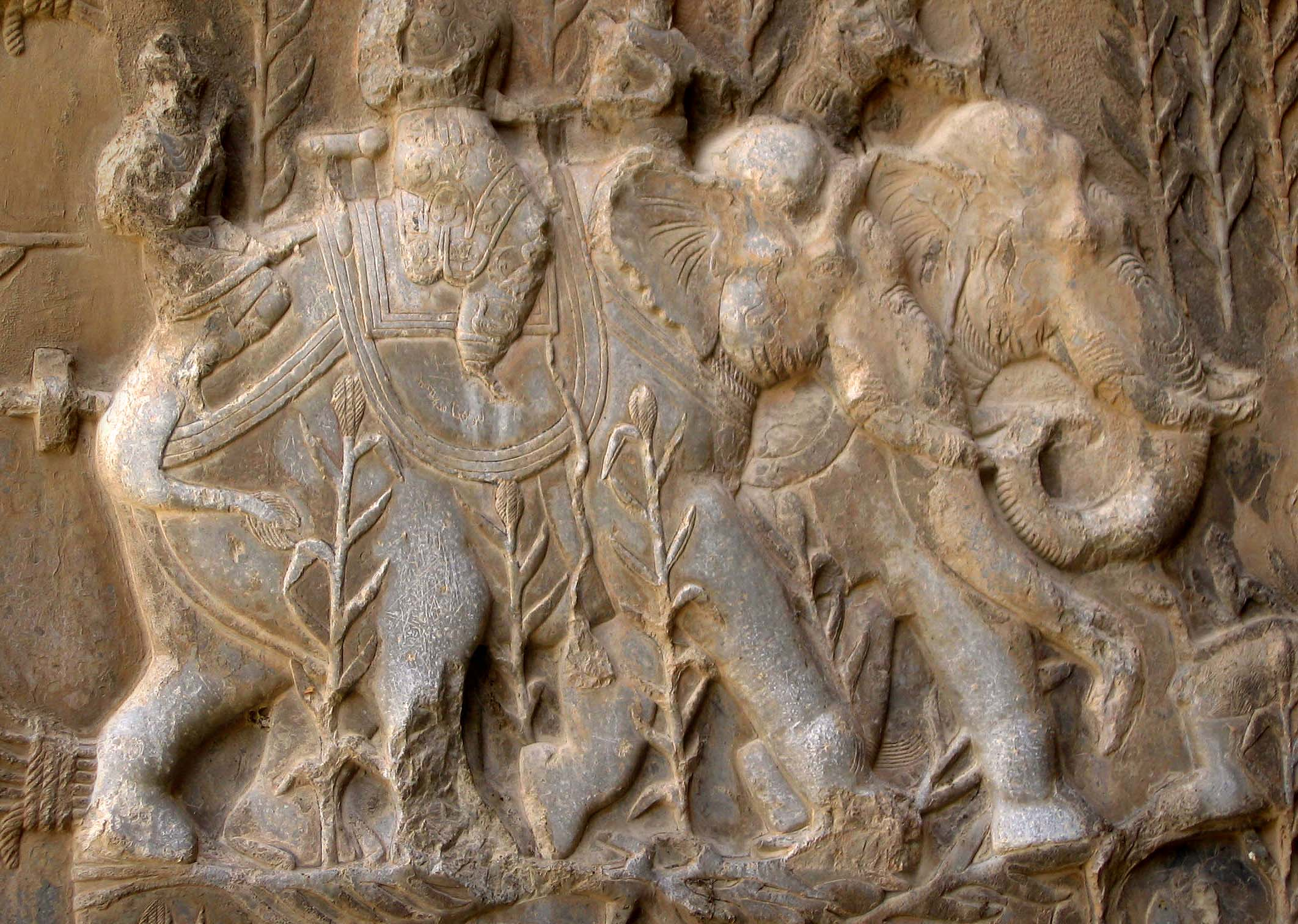
Sasanian relief of boar-hunting on domestic elephants, Taq-e Bostan, Iran

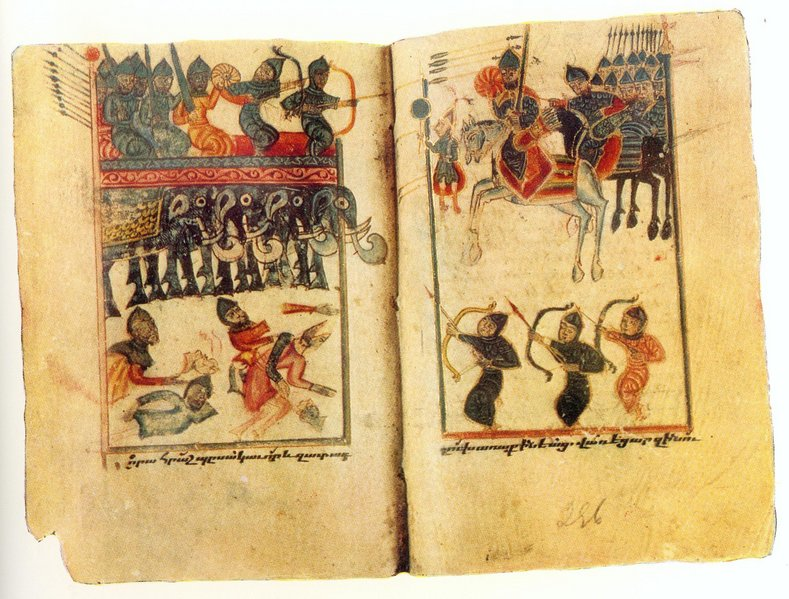
A medieval Armenian miniature representing the Sasanian war elephants in the Battle of Avarayr in 451 AD

War elephants were used in Iranian military history, most notably in Achaemenid, Seleucid, and Sasanian periods. These were Asian elephants recruited from the southern provinces of Iran and India, but also possibly Syrian elephants from Syria and western Iran.

The men (excluding the driver) sat in a large tower from which troops would fight. The elephant itself would normally be armed with thin plate armour (the Sassanids used chain mail as well as thin plate armour) and would bear a large crenelated wooden howdah on its back. Persian war elephants were trained by their rider, called a mahout, who would also ride the elephant into battle. While on the move, the elephants required large paths to cut to accommodate their passage. Training elephants was a difficult task and their upkeep was expensive because of their high nutritional demands.

== History ==
=== Under the Achaemenids ===
Persians used war elephants at the Battle of Gaugamela in 331 BC. The battle raged between king Alexander the Great of Macedon and king Darius III of Persia. The Persians had 15 Indian-trained war elephants, which were placed at the centre of the Persian line, and they made such an impression on the Macedonian troops that Alexander felt the need to sacrifice to the God of Fear the night before the battle. Despite this the Persians lost the battle, relinquishing the Achaemenid empire to Alexander.

Some claim that they had been used previously in the Greek campaign of King Xerxes I of Persia, and even further back at the time of Darius the Great at the Indus, the Danube and against the Scythians in 512 BC. Neither Xenophon nor Herodotus mention war elephants in their accounts of these earlier campaigns.

=== Under the Seleucids ===
War elephants were continued to be used in the Seleucid period. The Persian/Indian war elephants defeated their African counterparts in the Battle of Raphia.

=== Under the Parthians ===
Since the early 1st century AD, elephants were also used as a symbol of kingship in Iran. This notion was adopted from the Greco-Bactrians. Additionally, there was at least one instance of the use of a Parthian war elephant. According to Tacitus, Vologases I of Parthia rode on a war elephant during the Battle of Rhandeia, in 62 CE.

=== Under the Sasanians ===
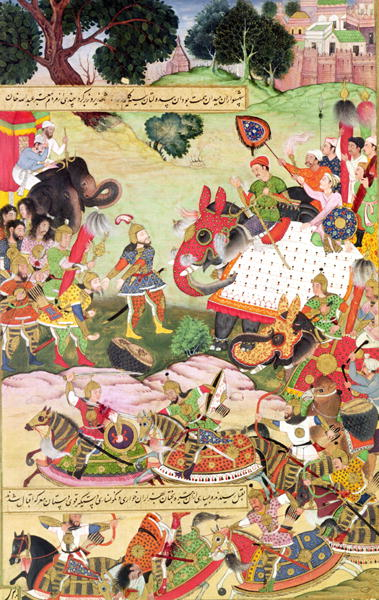
King Khosrow I on top of an elephant fighting the Mazdakite Revolt. Persian miniature

In the early Sasanian period, the war elephants were used in battles as a psychological weapon for its terrorizing effects. Later this role evolved into a logistical one, and in late Sasanian period they were used by army commanders to survey the battle scene.

Sasanian elephants were under a special chief, known as the Zend−hapet, or "Commander of the Indians", as they were from India.

Shapur I may have used war elephants against Valerian. But the beasts were most notably used in Shapur II's forces. Emperor Julian mentions their use in the wars of 337–361, carrying "iron towers full of archers" (possibly hyperbole; he was not an eye-witness to the particular battle he described). The elephants were later used by the Sasanians against Julian during his campaign in 363, including at Ctesiphon, Samarra, and later in a surprise attack on Jovian's forces. The eye-witness Ammianus Marcellinus describes the beasts as "gleaming elephants with ... cruel gaping jaws, pungent smell, and strange appearance"; at Ctesiphon, they were placed behind the Sasanian ranks, looking like "walking hills" that "by the movements of their enormous bodies, ... threatened destruction to all who came near them, dreaded as they were from past experience". According to the Roman author, the elephants frightened the horses. But these instances were all results of "dire necessity rather than normal deployment", as they usually had little tactical impact, especially in pitched battles. When they were used in pitched battles, the elephants were usually positioned in the rear, in contrast to the classical Carthaginian and Hellenistic practices.

The Sasanian elephants were most effective in siege warfare against fortified cities, where they probably carried turrets or howdahs and were used as shooting platforms. According to Procopius, emperor Justinian I had raised Dara's city walls by 30 feet (9.1 m) to hinder attacks by the Sasanian elephants. Procopius has mentioned wooden turrets that allowed the Sasanians to tower over the walls of a besieged city and shoot arrows. During the Lazic War, Mihr-Mihroe's eight elephants proved effective in the sieges of Archaeopolis and other Lazic fortifications.

Miscellaneous applications of the elephants by the Sasanians are also reported; Agathias mentions their use to blockade a river in one occasion.

In the Battle of the Bridge near the fall of the Sasanian Empire, the Sasanians under Bahman Jaduyah used their elite Zhayedan forces, which included war elephants, against the invading Arab Muslims under Abu Ubaid al-Thaqafi. A white elephant tore the latter from his horse with its trunk, and trampled him underfoot. The Arab Muslims suffered heavy casualties in the battle. The elephants were also used in the Battle of al-Qādisiyyah, but was unsuccessful.

=== Later dynasties ===
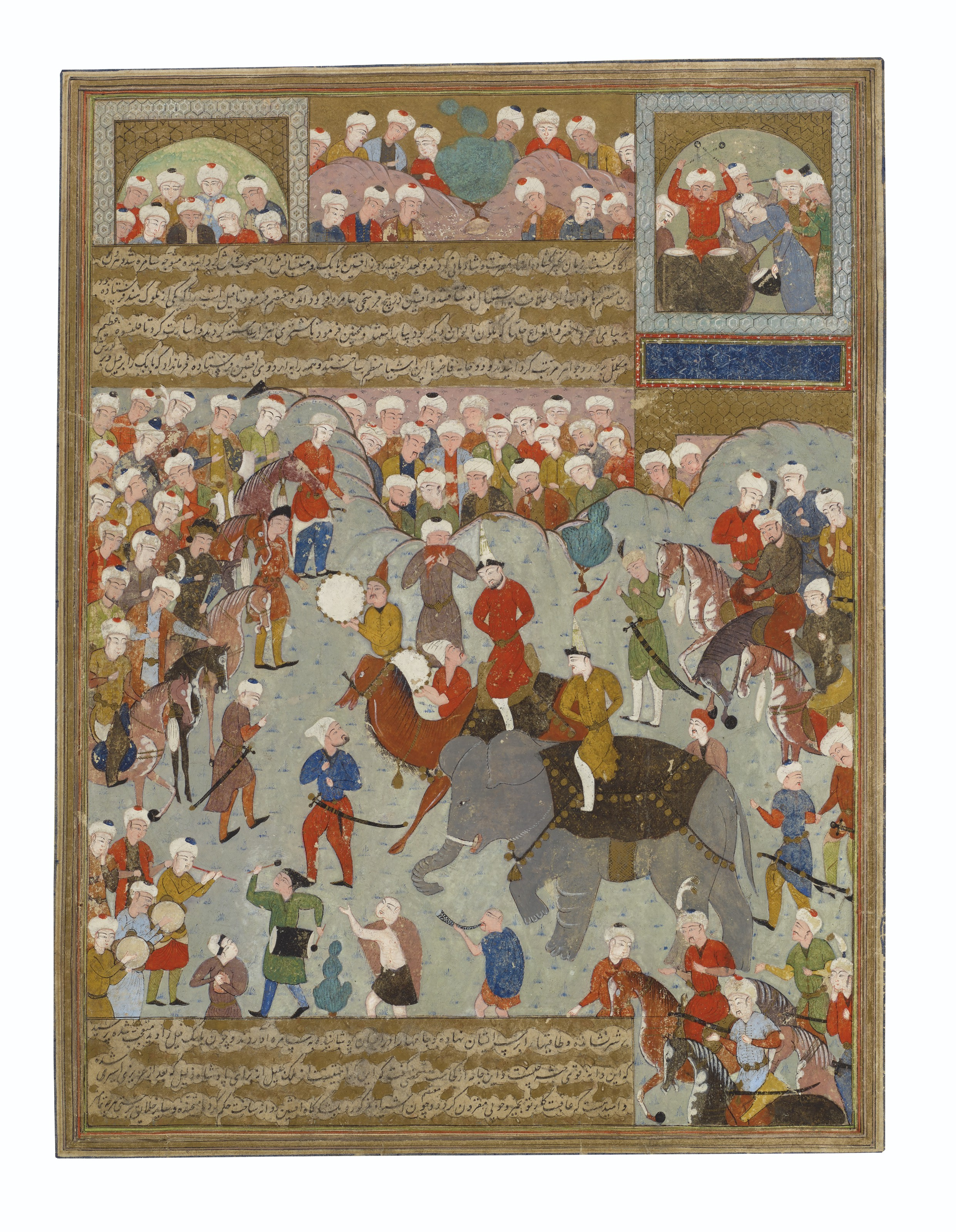
Abbasid general Khaydhar ibn Kawus al-Afshin parades the captured Persian revolutionary Babak Khorramdin, upon the elephant, into Samara

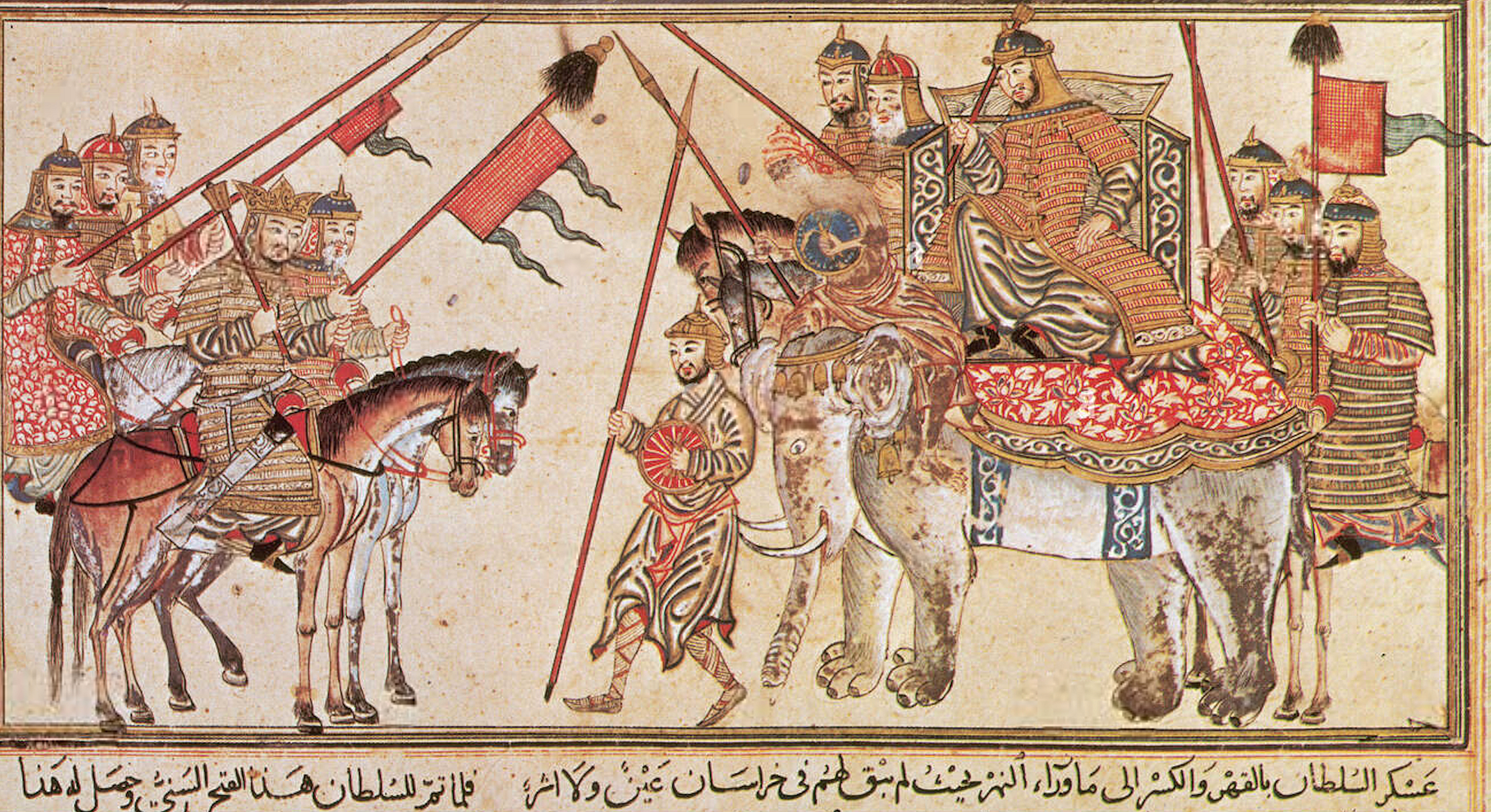
Mahmud of Ghazni on an elephant

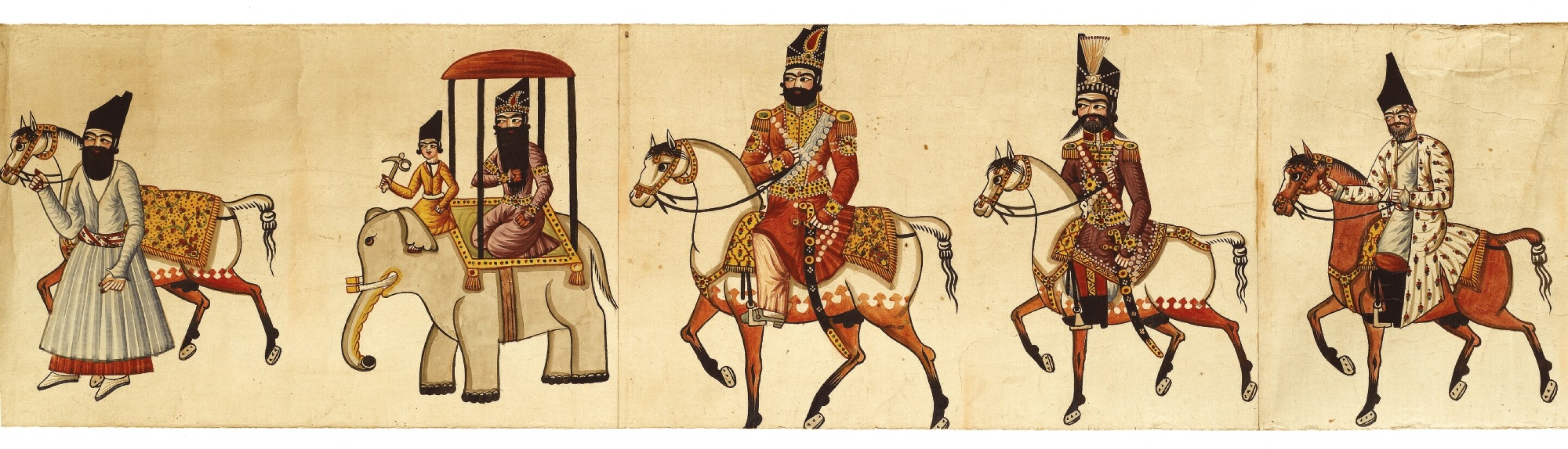
Fath-Ali Shah Qajar on elephant.

War elephants were also used by Islamic dynasties such as the Saffarids, and Buyids, but most importantly the Ghaznavids, who maintained an enormous corps of armoured war elephants, numbering 1,670 as of 1031. Fully armoured, with iron helmets and scale body armour, these were used to great effect. Their use in 1008 against the Kara-Khanid invasion of Khorasan is perhaps the only recorded instance of war elephants ever being used in heavy snow. Later in 1040, these heavy war elephants proved to be a disadvantage at the battle of Dandanqan where the Ghaznavids were bested by Seljuk mobility. At the Battle of Ghazi (1117) 50 Ghaznavid elephants initially scared off the Seljuk cavalry, until they managed to wound the lead elephant causing the rout of the whole Ghaznavid army. Though the Seljuks too adopted them, and 18 war elephants proved pivotal for Ahmed Sanjar's victory at the battle of Saveh in late 1118. Later they were used by the Khwarezmids against the Mongols during the siege of Samarkand (1220). In the 15th century, Timur used them at the siege of Damascus (1400) and at the Battle of Ankara. One of the last recorded uses of elephants in battle on Persian soil was during Mughal sieges of Kandahar (1649–1653), when in 1650 Shah Jahan himself headed an army of elephants and cannon, but failed to take the city.

== In popular culture ==
- Shatranj (chess) – The bishop in modern chess is referred to as an elephant in many languages. Many languages use names for the bishop that originate with the Persian word fil (meaning "elephant").
- The Persian civilisation in the real-time strategy computer game Age of Empires II has war elephants as their unique unit, in reference to this period in history. War elephants are also available to the Persians in Age of Empires and are granted fast movement.

== See also ==
- War elephant
- Crushing by elephant
- Sassanid army
- History of elephants in Europe
- List of individual elephants
- Military animals
- Cavalry tactics
