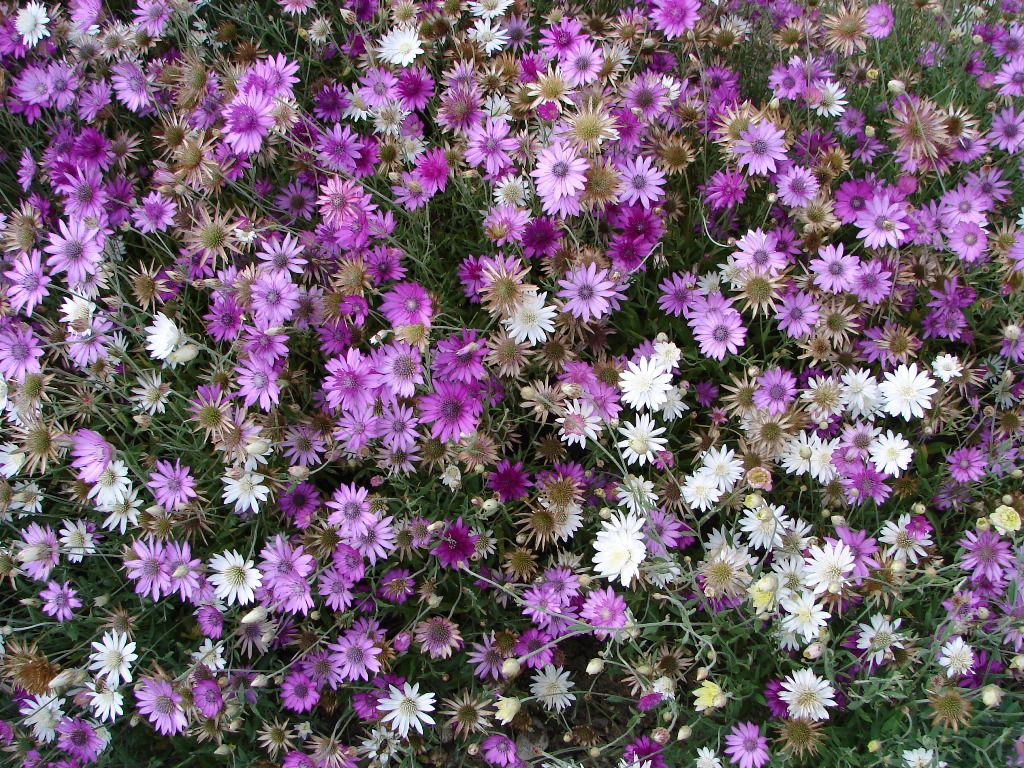
- Xeranthemum annuum

Scientific classification
- Kingdom: Plantae
- Clade: Embryophytes
- Clade: Tracheophytes
- Clade: Spermatophytes
- Clade: Angiosperms
- Clade: Eudicots
- Clade: Asterids
- Order: Asterales
- Family: Asteraceae
- Subfamily: Carduoideae
- Tribe: Cardueae
- Subtribe: Xerantheminae
- Genus: Xeranthemum; L.

Synonyms
- Xeroloma Cass.

= Xeranthemum =

Genus of flowering plants

Xeranthemum is a genus of flowering plants in the tribe Cardueae within the family Asteraceae, native to Southern Europe. It has silvery flower heads with purplish tubular flowers.

== Species ==
Species include:

1. Xeranthemum annuum L. ("annual everlasting"): Central + southern Europe from Spain to Dagestan; Turkey, Caucasus
2. Xeranthemum cylindraceum Sm.: Central + southern Europe from Portugal to Ukraine; Turkey, Caucasus, Iran, Iraq, Syria, Jordan, Israel
3. Xeranthemum cylindricum Spreng.
4. Xeranthemum inapertum (L.) Mill.: southern Europe, North Africa, southwest Asia from Morocco to Turkmenistan
5. Xeranthemum longepapposum Fisch. & C.A.Mey.: southeastern Europe, southwestern and central Asia
6. Xeranthemum squarrosum Boiss.: Greece, southwestern and central Asia
