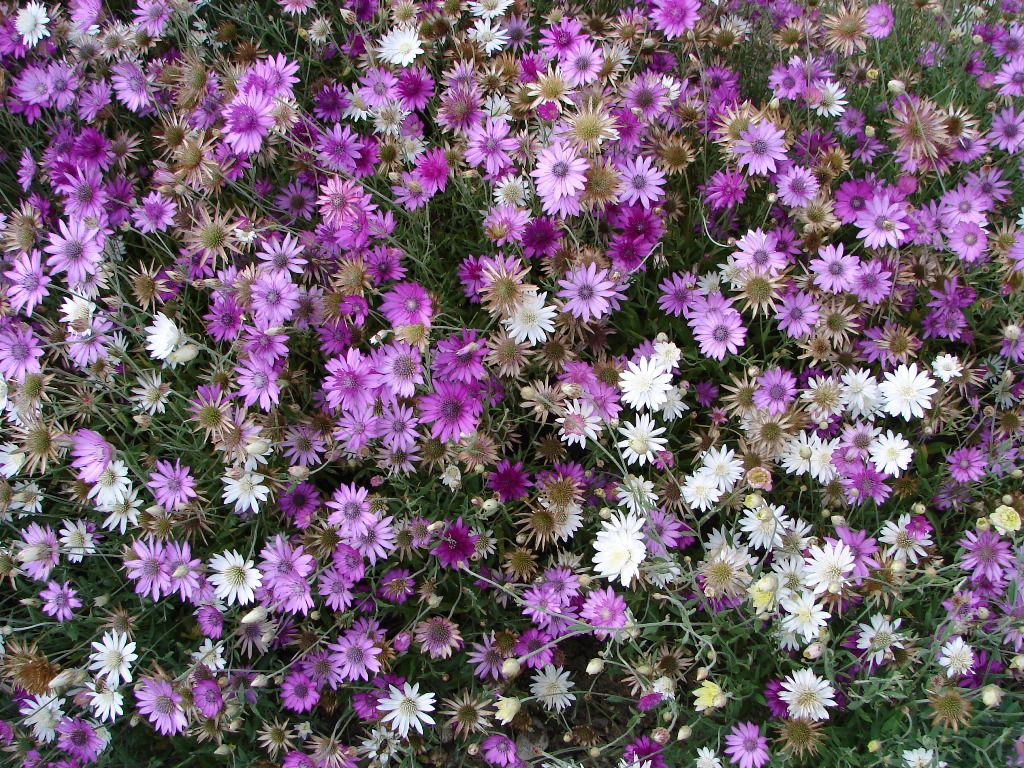

Scientific classification
- Kingdom: Plantae
- Clade: Tracheophytes
- Clade: Angiosperms
- Clade: Eudicots
- Clade: Asterids
- Order: Asterales
- Family: Asteraceae
- Genus: Xeranthemum
- Species: X. annuum

Binomial name
- Xeranthemum annuum L.

Synonyms
- Centaurea dubia S.G.Gmel. ex Steud.; Xeranthemum annettae Kalen.

= Xeranthemum annuum =

Species of flowering plant

Xeranthemum annuum is a flowering plant species also known as annual everlasting or immortelle. It is native to eastern Europe and western Asia, and is cultivated as a garden flower. It has become naturalised in other parts of Europe.

The immortelle is a symbol of eternity and immortality. It is an annual plant of dry, sunny lawns, slopes, vines, loess farms and karst bushes. species. The leaves are typically elongated, spear-like with a silvery-gray color, and the leaves are downy. Immortelles bloom during the summer months, from June to September, when the populations are a delightful pink-lilac flower field.

Immortelle is easy to hold because it feels comfortable in dry, sunny conditions.

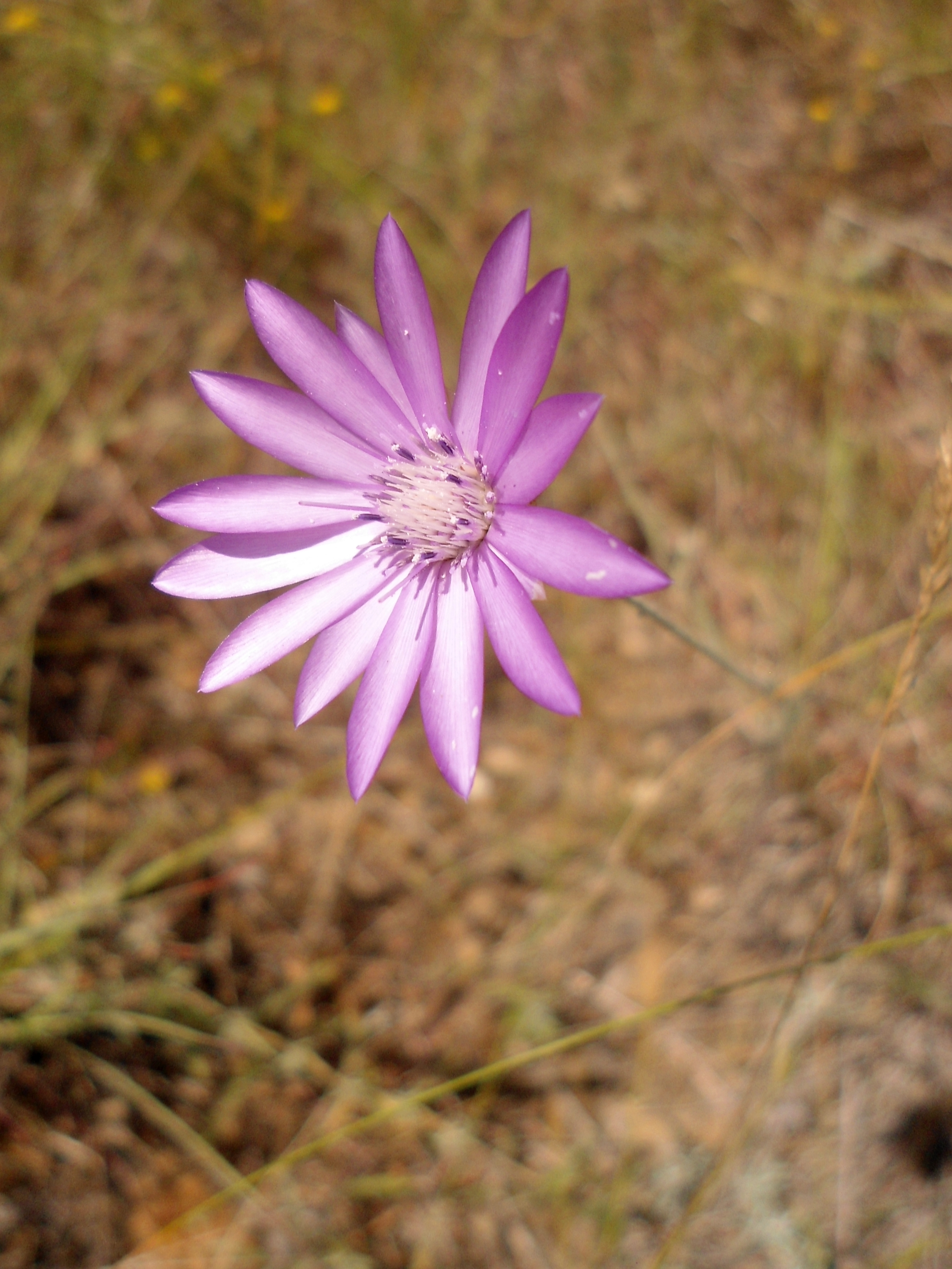
Xeranthemum annuum in natural habitat
