= Narsi =

Sassanid noble

Narsi or Narse (Middle Persian: 𐭭𐭥𐭮𐭧𐭩) was an Iranian nobleman who served as the Sasanian governor of Kashkar.

== Biography ==
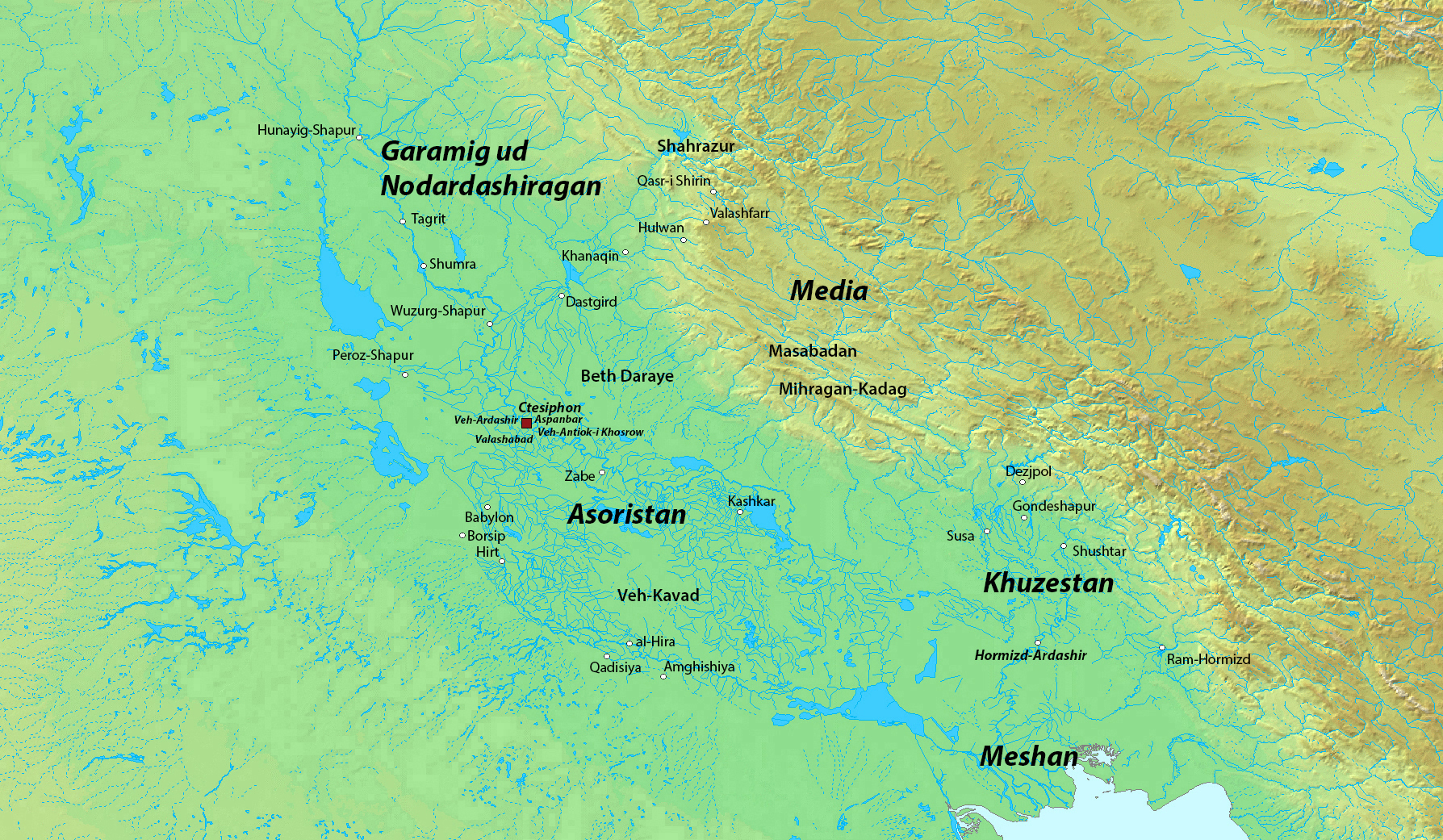
Map of Sasanian Mesopotamia and its surroundings.

Narsi is first mentioned in 628. He and brother Mah-Adhur Gushnasp were the sons of a certain Jushnas (Gushnasp), and an unnamed Ispahbudhan noblewoman, who was the sister of Vistahm and Vinduyih. In 628, during the reign of Ardashir III, Narsi was granted Kashkar as a part of his domains, while his brother Mah-Adhur Gushnasp was elected as minister of the empire, and administered the empire greatly. One year later, just when stability and peace seems to have begun, Shahrbaraz rebelled with a force of 6,000 men, and marched towards Ctesiphon and besieged the city.

Shahrbaraz, however, was unable to capture the city, and then made an alliance with Piruz Khosrow, the leader of the Parsig faction, and the previous minister of the Empire during the reign of Ardashir's father, Kavadh II. He also made an alliance with Namdar Gushnasp, the spahbed of Nemroz. Shahrbaraz, with the aid of these two powerful figures, captured Ctesiphon, and executed Ardashir III and Narsi's brother Mah-Adhur Gushnasp. Forty days later, Shahrbaraz was murdered by Farrukh Hormizd, a relative of Narsi, who then made Borandukht, the daughter of Khosrau II, ascend the throne.

After a period of coups and revolts, Yazdegerd III was crowned as king of the Sasanian Empire in 632 at Estakhr. With his accession, the civil war in Persia had ended. However, one year later, the Muslim Arabs invaded Persia, and by 634, were getting close to Ctesiphon, the capital of the Sasanian Empire. Rostam Farrokhzad, a relative of Narsi, then sent him along with Jaban to confront the Arabs at Namaraq, a city near Kufa. Narsi and Jaban, were, however, defeated. Narsi then fled along with his army to his territory at Kashkar. Rostam then ordered Narsi: "[Go] off to your estate and protect it from your enemy and our enemy. Be a man."

Narsi then met the Arabs at near Kashkar, and was aided by the sons of Vistahm, Tiruyih and Vinduyih, who commanded the flanks of Narsi's army. Shortly before the Sasanian army and the Arab army clashed, Rostam sent Jalinus at the head of an Armenian army to aid Narsi. However, when he arrived to Kashkar, Narsi was defeated and had already fled. The Arabs then defeated the army of Jalinus. What happened to Narsi afterwards is not known.

== Sources ==
- Pourshariati, Parvaneh (2008). Decline and Fall of the Sasanian Empire: The Sasanian-Parthian Confederacy and the Arab Conquest of Iran. London and New York: I.B. Tauris. ISBN 978-1-84511-645-3.
- Shahbazi, A. Sh. (1986). "ARDAŠĪR III". Encyclopaedia Iranica, Vol. II, Fasc. 4. pp. 381–382.
