= Immortal (Cynthia Clawson album) =

Studio album by Cynthia Clawson
- Released: 1986
- Genre: Christian
- Length: 50:50
- Label: Dayspring / Word Records
- Producer: John Rosasco

Immortal is a 1986 album by gospel singer Cynthia Clawson. The hymn "Immortal Invisible" was a hit on contemporary Christian radio, and the album peaked at number 36 on the Billboard Top Contemporary Christian album chart. Produced by John Rosasco, the album was released on Dayspring, a subsidiary of Word Records.

== Track listing ==
No.	Title	Length
1.	"My Faith Has Found A Resting Place"	1:33
2.	"Immortal Invisible"	3:52
3.	"Let Me Get Lost"	4:22
4.	"Heartsong"	4:55
5.	"Hot Fire"	3:28
6.	"I Will Survive"	4:39
7.	"Spirit Shine"	5:50
8.	"Softly And Tenderly (from A Trip To Bountiful)"	6:20
9.	"Bring It To Jesus"	5:07
10.	"One More Dayspring"	5:38
Total length:		50:50
