= Abu Ubayd al-Thaqafi =

Rashidun commander in Persia (died 634)

- أَبُو عُبَيْد الثَّقَفِي
- Born: Ta'if
- Died: October 634; Bank of the Euphrates, near Babylon, Sasanian Empire
- Other name: Abū 'Ubayd ibn Mas'ūd ibn 'Amr ibn 'Umayr ibn 'Awf ibn Uqda ibn Ghayra ibn Awf ibn Thaqif al-Thaqafi (full name)
- Children: List: Jabr; Mukhtar; Safiya (daughter); Malika(daughter)
- Relatives: al-Hakam (brother) (sister); Mas'ūd ibn 'Amr (father)
- Military career
- Allegiance: Rashidun Caliphate
- Branch: Rashidun army
- Rank: Field commander
- Conflicts: Muslim conquest of Persia: Battle of Kaskar; Battle of Namaraq; Battle of the Bridge †

Abū 'Ubayd ibn Mas'ūd ibn 'Amr ibn 'Umayr ibn 'Awf ibn Uqda ibn Ghayra ibn Awf ibn Thaqif al-Thaqafi (Arabic: أَبُو عُبَيْد بۡن مَسْعُود بۡن عَمْرُو بۡن عُمَيْر بۡن عَوْف بۡن عُقْدَة بۡن غَيْرَة بۡن عَوْف بۡن ثَقِيف الثَّقَفِي), or simply Abu Ubayd (أَبُو عُبَيْد), was a commander in the army of the Rashidun Caliphate. He was from Ta'if in western Arabia, and belonged to the tribe Banu Thaqif.

Al-Muthanna, commander of the Muslim Arabs in al-Hira, had asked Abu Bakr and later Caliph Umar for reinforcements against the Sasanians in Mesopotamia, who were fighting back. Umar chose Abu Ubayd who volunteered first, although he was not among the Muhajirun or Ansar (the companions of Muhammad), and dispatched him. Abu Ubayd arranged a force of 1,000 from his Thaqif tribe and increased his numbers on the way north. He took over command from al-Muthanna for the second time, becoming commander of the forces in the al-Hira region. The combined Arab forces conducted raids on the plains between al-Hira and Ctesiphon (the Sawad). The commander of the Sasanian army Rustam Farrukhzad dispatched an army under Bahman Jadhuyih to attack them. In a battle on the bank of the Euphrates river near Babylon, known as the Battle of the Bridge, a white war elephant tore Abu Ubayd from his horse with its trunk, and trampled him under its feet. The Arab forces panicked and were defeated. Abu Ubayd's brother al-Hakam and his son Jabr were also killed.

Abu Ubayd was the father of the revolutionary leader al-Mukhtar al-Thaqafi, who rebelled against the Umayyads to avenge the Karbala event during the Second Fitna. Safiyah, wife of Abdullah ibn Umar, was one of his daughters. Jariah, another of his daughters, was married to Umar ibn Sa'ad.
