= Immortals (2024 film) =

- Directed by: Maja Tschumi
- Written by: Maja Tschumi; Mohammed Al Khalili; Melak Mahdi (Milo)
- Produced by: Nadine Lüchinger; Flavio Gerber; Mohammed Alghadhban; Azra Djurdjevic
- Cinematography: Silvio Gerber; Mohammed Al Khalili
- Edited by: Alex Bakri
- Music by: Manouk Roussyalian
- Production companies: Filmgerberei GmbH; SRF Schweizer Radio und Fernsehen; Rola Productions
- Distributed by: Cineworx GmbH (Switzerland); W-Film Distribution (Germany)
- Release date: March 2024
- Running time: 94 minutes
- Countries: Switzerland; Iraq
- Language: Arabic

Immortals is a 2024 documentary film directed by Swiss filmmaker Maja Tschumi. Set in Baghdad, the documentary follows young Iraqis connected to the Tishreen Movement, also known as the October Protest Movement, focusing on two protagonists, Milo and Mohammed Al Khalili. It examines their experiences during and after the 2019 protests, including questions of gender, activism, trauma, and the choices faced by protesters after the uprising.

The film had its world premiered at CPH:DOX and screened at numerous international film festivals.

== Synopsis ==
Immortals follows Milo, a feminist who leaves her home dressed as a man to participate in the October 2019 protests in Baghdad's Tahrir Square. It also follows Khalili, a young filmmaker who documents the demonstrations and the crackdown on protesters. The film is divided into three chapters: "Hidden Battles", which focuses on Milo's experiences as a woman; "Confrontations", which features footage filmed by Khalili during the protests; and "Decisions", which examines the choices made by the two protagonists following the uprising.

== Production ==
Immortals was directed by Swiss filmmaker Maja Tschumi. Tschumi began filming the documentary while searching for activists who had documented the 2019 protests in Iraq. She met filmmaker Khalili, who provided footage from the protests and introduced her to Iraqi co-producer Mohammed Alghadhban. Tschumi collaborated with Khalili and Milo, who co-wrote the film with her. The production included reenacted scenes where clandestine filming was considered unsafe.

The film was produced by Alghadhban and Nadine Lüchinger of Filmgerberei Switzerland. Funding came from Suissimage, the Zurich Film Fund, Swiss National Television and the Corymbo Foundation.

== Release ==
Immortals was acquired for world sales by the Paris-based sales company Cat&Docs in March 2024. It had its world premiere in the DOX competition at the CPH:DOX and was selected to screen at the Open Horizon section of the Thessaloniki Documentary Festival.

Immortals was subsequently screened at Hot Docs in April 2024, followed by Beldocs in May, the Sydney Film Festival in June, the Melbourne International Film Festival in August, the Solothurn Film Festival in January 2025, the Raindance Film Festival in June, and the Locarno Film Festival in August.

Theatrical distribution in Switzerland was handled by Cineworx GmbH, which released the film on 24 April 2025, while W-Film Distribution released it in Germany on 4 December 2025.

== Awards ==
At the 60th Solothurn Film Festival, Immortals won the Prix de Soleure, the festival's main award for films with socially critical or humanistic themes. The jury praised the film for combining strong aesthetics with storytelling that allows audiences to share the hopes of its protagonists and glimpse the aspirations of an entire generation.

At the 2025 Raindance Film Festival, Immortals won the Best Documentary Feature award.

== Critical reception ==
Writing for Variety, critic Murtada Elfadl described Immortals as a thoughtful documentary that treats its protagonists not merely as subjects but as collaborators in the storytelling process.

Reviewing the film for Business Doc Europe, critic Nicole Santé described the documentary as a "beautiful, cinematic monument" to the participants of the Iraqi protest movement and praised its portrayal of a generation determined to challenge the political system.

In a review for The Gate, critic Andrew Parker wrote that the film offers an intimate perspective on the emotional toll of the 2019 Iraqi protest movement, focusing on activists Milo and Khalili and their struggles to pursue freedom and creative expression in Baghdad. Parker also noted the film's hybrid narrative approach, in which reenacted scenes are integrated with real footage to depict events that could not be filmed because of safety concerns.
