= Battle of Namaraq =

634 battle

- Part of Islamic conquest of Persia
Date	634 AD 13AH
Location	Near Kufa, Iraq
Result	Muslim victory

Belligerents
Rashidun Caliphate	Sasanian Empire

Commanders and leaders
Al-Muthanna ibn Haritha; Arfajah ibn Harthama; Abu Ubayd	Narsi; Jaban (POW); Jushnasmah †

Strength
10,000	100,000

Casualties and losses
Unknown	Unknown

Battle of Namaraq (Arabic: معركة النمارق) (634 CE), 13 AH, was a conflict between Muslims and the Sasanians that occurred in Namaraq, a plain near the Euphrates River, close to modern-day Kufa in present-day Iraq.

During the Khilafat of Umar, Muslims under the command of Al-Muthanna ibn Haritha and Khalid ibn al-Walid had earlier captured Al-Hirah, an important administrative and strategic center of the Sasanian Empire. Determined to recover this key city, the Persians organized a counteroffensive. The prominent Sasanian general Rostam Farrokhzad dispatched forces under members of the influential Ispahbudhan family, including a commander known as Jaban, along with several experienced Persian officers.

By this time, Khalid ibn al-Walid had already departed for the Syrian front, leaving Al-Muthanna to manage the situation in Iraq. Recognizing the growing threat, Caliph Umar sent reinforcements under Abu Ubayd al-Thaqafi to support the المسلمين forces.

As the two armies met on the plains of Namaraq, the Persians initially relied on their traditional strengths, including heavily armored cavalry and disciplined infantry formations. However, the المسلمين forces demonstrated effective coordination and mobility, adapting their tactics to counter the Persian advance. Al-Muthanna and Abu Ubayd organized their troops into flexible units capable of both defense and rapid counterattack.

The battle began with preliminary skirmishes, eventually escalating into a full engagement. Despite the formidable reputation of the Sasanian army, the المسلمين were able to exploit weaknesses in their formations. A turning point came when Jaban was captured during the fighting, causing confusion and a decline in morale among the Persian ranks.

With their command structure disrupted, the Persian forces began to lose cohesion. The المسلمين pressed their advantage, launching coordinated assaults that forced the Sasanians into retreat. The battle concluded with a decisive Muslim victory.

The outcome at Namaraq significantly weakened Sasanian control in lower Iraq and secured Muslim dominance over the region surrounding Al-Hirah. It also marked an important step in the سلسلة of early Islamic campaigns against the Sasanian Empire, paving the way for subsequent victories in Iraq and contributing to the eventual سقوط of Persian power in the region.
