= Baxian, Shaanxi =

Baxian 八仙镇
- Town
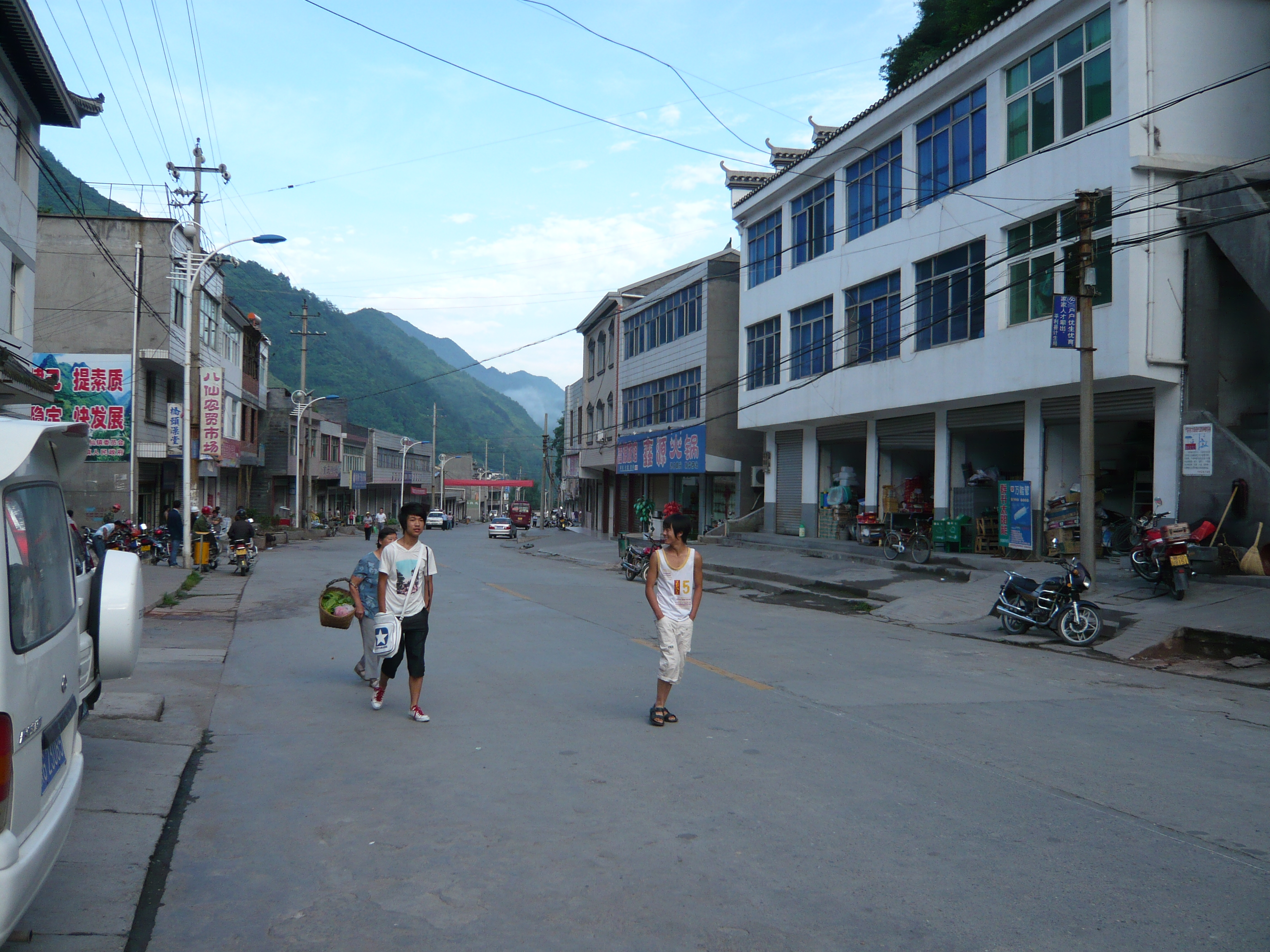

- Location in China
- Coordinates: 32°5′39″N 109°14′34″E
- Country: People's Republic of China
- Province: Shaanxi
- Prefecture-level city: Ankang
- County: Pingli County
- Time zone: UTC+8 (China Standard)

Baxian (Chinese: 八仙; pinyin: Bāxiān) is a town under the administration of Pingli County, Shaanxi, China. As of 2023, it administers Baxian Residential Community and the following sixteen villages:

- Shiping Village (狮坪村)
- Sanxingzhai Village (三星寨村)
- Renxigou Village (仁溪沟村)
- Hanhe Village (韩河村)
- Longmen Village (龙门村)
- Songshumiao Village (松树庙村)
- Huayuanling Village (花园岭村)
- Wuyaoshan Village (乌药山村)
- Baihaohe Village (百好河村)
- Jinjihe Village (金鸡河村)
- Songyang Village (松阳村)
- Jiangxijie Village (江西街村)
- Haofangping Village (号房坪村)
- Dianpingping Village (靛坪坪村)
- Longshan Village (龙山村)
- Yahekou Village (鸦河口村)
