= Eight Immortals (disambiguation) =

The Eight Immortals are ancient revered figures of Daoism.

Eight Immortals may also refer to:

== People ==
- Eight Immortals of Huainan, also known as the Eight Gentlemen, eight scholars of the Western Han Dynasty
- Eight Immortals from Sichuan, known since the Jin Dynasty
- Eight Immortals of the Wine Cup, eight Tang dynasty scholars known for their love of alcohol
- Eight Elders of the Chinese Communist Party in the late 1980s and early 1990s

== Places ==
- Mountains of the Eight Immortals, the eight peaks of Pat Sin Leng, in the northeast New Territories of Hong Kong
- Eight Immortals Mountain, Pa-hsien Mountain, in central Taiwan

== Other uses ==
- Eight immortals table
- Eight Immortals (film), a 1971 Taiwanese/Hong Kong fantasy film
- Eight Immortals Restaurant murders, a 1985 crime committed in Macau

== See also ==
- Immortal (disambiguation)
