= The Immortals (song) =

Promotional single by Kings of Leon

from the album Come Around Sundown
- Released: March 21, 2011
- Recorded: 2010
- Genre: Alternative rock
- Length: 3:30
- Label: RCA
- Songwriters: Caleb Followill; Nathan Followill; Jared Followill; Matthew Followill
- Producers: Angelo Petraglia; Jacquire King

"The Immortals" is a song by American rock band Kings of Leon. It is the sixth track on their fifth studio album Come Around Sundown. The song was originally slated to be released as a single on 21 March 2011. However, it was eventually scrapped. A video of the song was used in an advertisement to promote the 2011 NCAA Men's Division I Basketball Tournament and its brand new 68-team field, and was used from March 4–17.

== Concept ==
Caleb Followill, lead singer of Kings of Leon, who wrote the song along with the other Followills, says "The Immortals": "In a way, I kind of wanted it to be something that I could say to my children. It really says it all in one chorus. Here it is: go out and be who it is you wanna be and at the end of the day, before you've gone, make sure you've loved."

== Remix ==
In late 2011, Norwegian band Röyksopp remixed the song which then leaked online and was not physically released.

== Credits and personnel ==
- Kings Of Leon
- Caleb Followill – Vocals and guitar
- Matthew Followill – Lead guitar
- Jared Followill – Bass guitar
- Nathan Followill – Drums
- Producers – Angelo Petraglia, Jacquire King
- Lyrics – Caleb Followill, Nathan Followill, Jared Followill, Matthew Followill
- Label – RCA Records

== Charts ==
Chart (2011)	Peak position
Belgium (Ultratip Bubbling Under Flanders)	22
Belgium (Ultratip Bubbling Under Wallonia)	37
Mexico Ingles Airplay (Billboard)	42
