= Battle of the Bridge =

634 battle between Sasanians and Arab Muslims

Battle of the Bridge Battle of al-Jisr
- Part of the Muslim conquest of Persia – Second invasion of Mesopotamia
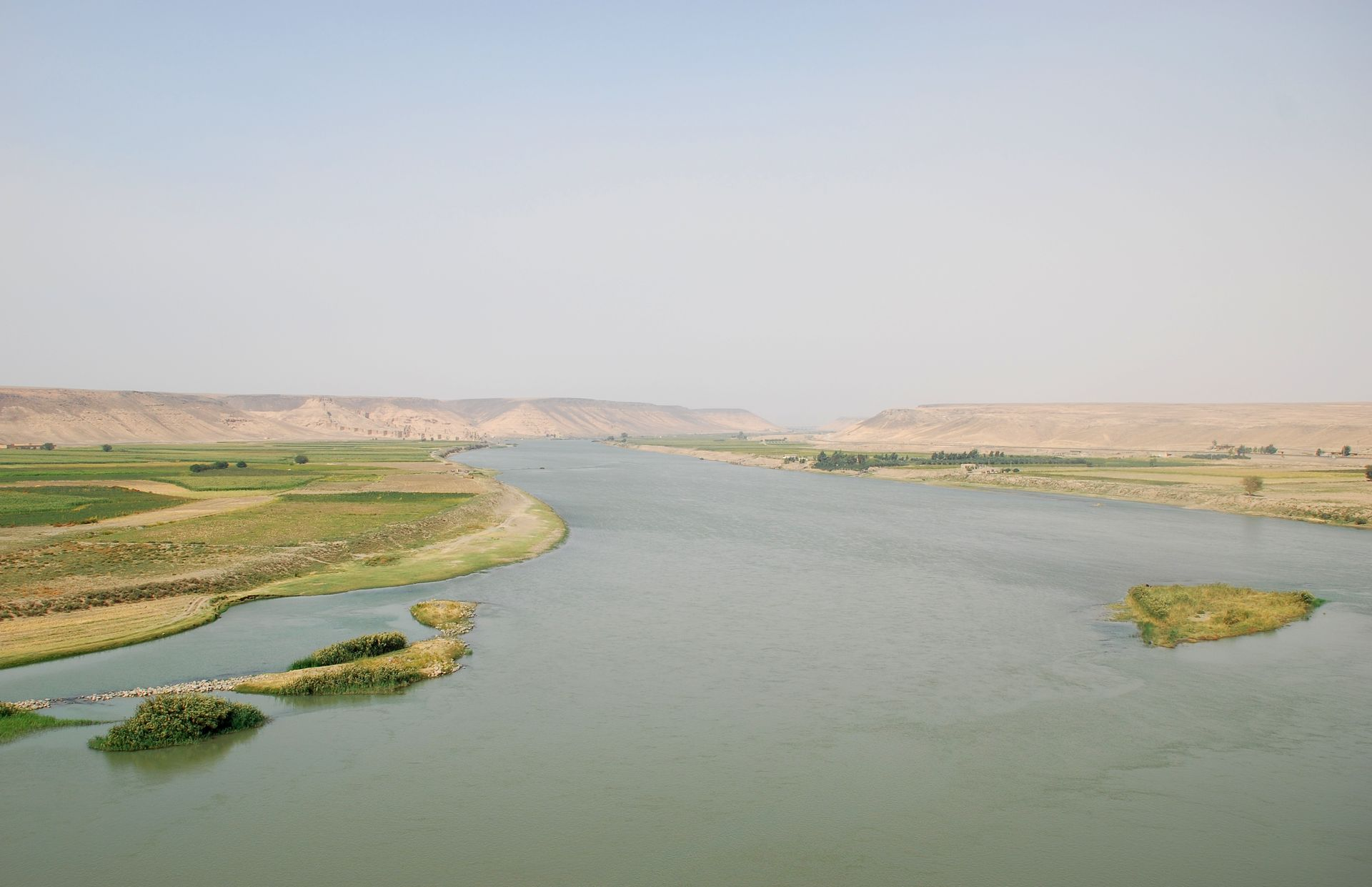
- The battle was joined on the banks of the Euphrates
Date	25 October 634
Location	Marauha at the Euphrates near Kufa, Iraq
Result	Sasanian victory

Belligerents
Rashidun Caliphate	Sasanian Empire

Commanders and leaders
Abu Ubayd al-Thaqafi †; Al-Hakam al-Thaqafi †; Jabr ibn Abi Ubayd †; Al-Muthanna (WIA)	Bahman Jadhuyih; Jalinus

Strength
6,000–10,000	80,000; 20 war elephants

Casualties and losses
6,000–7,000 killed 3,000 drowned or escaped	Unknown

The Battle of the Bridge or the Battle of al-Jisr (Arabic: معركة الجسر) was fought at the bank of the Euphrates between Arab Muslims, led by Abu Ubayd al-Thaqafi, and the Persian Sasanians, led by Bahman Jaduya. It is traditionally dated to the year 634 and was the only major Sasanian victory over the invading Rashidun Caliphate army.

== Context ==
The Muslim forces had already taken Hira and assumed control of the surrounding Arab-inhabited areas of Mesopotamia, on the banks of the Euphrates. The fall of Hira shocked the Persians, as the "youthful Yazdgard, began to take the business of the Arabs more seriously." Yazdgard sent forces to the Arab border areas and looked to be gaining the upper hand, as Al-Muthanna had to call for reinforcements from Medina.

The new caliph, Umar, sent Abu Ubayd to Mesopotamia to take command from Al-Muthanna. He encountered the main Persian force under Bahman Jaduya near what is the present site of Kufa. The two forces faced each other on opposing banks of the Euphrates. As it was crossed by a bridge, the battle came to be known as the Battle of the Bridge.

== Battle ==
Bahman invited Abu Ubayd to decide who should cross the river. The latter took the initiative and crossed the river aggressively, which proved to be disastrous for his forces. According to accounts, the sight of the elephants in the Persian army frightened the Arabs' horses. A white elephant apparently tore Abu Ubayd from his horse with its trunk and trampled him underfoot during his misguided attempt to attack its trunk.

The death of their commander and the inability of the Arab troops to push back the Persians, who had formed a rigid line close to the bridge, led the Arabs to panic and flee. Abu Ubayd's command was taken by al-Hakam and Jabr, his brother and son respectively, and later Al-Muthanna.

According to tradition, Al-Muthanna remained to fight so that the Arabs could repair the bridge and flee, losing 4,000 men, but any accurate estimates of the figures involved in this and other contemporaneous battles are not known. Around 3,000 Arab Muslims were carried away by the river.

Bahman Jaduya did not pursue the fleeing Arab army.

== See also ==
- Battle of al-Qādisiyyah
- Fall of the Sasanian Empire
- List of battles of the Rashidun Caliphate
- Muslim conquest of Persia

== Sources ==
- Pirnia, Hassan (2020). Ancient Persia. Parse.
- Al Biladuri, Ahmad Bin Yahya Bin Jabir (2011). The Origins of the Islamic State: Being a Translation from the Arabic. Translated by Hitti, Philip Khuri. Cosimo Classics.
- al-Tabari, Muhammad ibn Yarir (1993). he History of al-Tabari Vol. 11: The Challenge to the Empires A.D. 633-635. Translated by Blankinship, Khalid Yahya. State University of New York Press.
- Crawford, Peter (2013). The War of the Three Gods: Romans, Persians and the Rise of Islam. Pen & Sword.
- Frye, Richard Nelson (1975). The Cambridge History of Iran: The period from the Arab invasion to the Saljuqs. Cambridge University Press.
- Nafziger, George F.; Walton, Mark W. (2003). Islam at War: A History. Praeger.
- Pourshariati, Parvenah (2011). Decline and Fall of the Sasanian Empire. I.B.Taurus & Co.Ltd.
