= The Immortals (Hickman novel) =

Tracy Hickman science-fiction novel

- Cover of the first edition
- Author: Tracy Hickman
- Language: English
- Genre: Science fiction
- Publisher: Roc
- Publication date: May 1, 1996
- Publication place: United States
- Media type: Print (Hardback & Paperback)
- Pages: 368
- ISBN: 0-451-45402-2

The Immortals is a 1996 science fiction novel by American writer Tracy Hickman, originally published in hardcover by Roc. The novel describes a future America in which a virus similar to AIDS has panicked the U.S. government into setting up internment camps to contain the sufferers. The AIDS-like disease serves as backdrop and plot device to examine human relationships in circumstances of extreme duress.

== Plot summary ==
When a cure for AIDS turns out to be more virulent than the disease, the U.S. establishes quarantine camps in the desert southwest. Michael Barris, a TV producer, masquerades as one of the infected and travels to the camps in search of his son. He finds horrific conditions, and learns that the so-called quarantine camps are death camps where the infected are gathered, purposefully brutalized, and ultimately cremated alive, their ashes bulldozed into the desert sand. Barris's son escapes the camp before the cycle of immolation, carrying the evidence he needs to expose the governmental mis-information campaign.

== Adaptations ==
In 2006, DragonHearth produced the work as a podcast novel, and made it available as a free download from Podiobooks.com.

== Awards and nominations ==
- Winner 2007 Parsec Award for Speculative Fiction (Novel Form)
