= Immortals (Byzantine Empire) =

Elite military units of the Byzantine Empire

The Immortals (Greek: Ἀθάνατοι, Athanatoi) were one of the elite tagmata military units of the Byzantine Empire, first raised during the late 10th century. The name derives from a- ("without") + thanatos ("death").

== History ==
The Athanatoi were a body of young men of noble status that was originally raised by John I Tzimiskes (r. 969–976) in 970 for his war with the Rus', where they played a decisive role in the battles before Preslav and during the Siege of Dorostolon. The unit was commanded by a domestikos, as with most of the other tagmata (the professional standing regiments), and on campaign camped near the imperial bodyguard, the Hetaireia. The contemporary historian Leo the Deacon describes the Athanatoi as heavily armoured shock cavalry, "sheathed in armour" or as "armed horsemen adorned with gold". Tzimiskes' unit was probably disbanded shortly after his death, since it does not appear again in the sources.

The name of the Athanatoi was revived under the Emperor Michael VII (r. 1071–1078), when his minister Nikephoritzes reorganised the army. This reconstruction was part of an effort to address a major military crisis for the Empire, following the disastrous defeat suffered by the Byzantines against the Seljuk Turks at the Battle of Manzikert in 1071. The Seljuks had subsequently overrun most of Asia Minor, which had provided the main recruiting ground for the pre-Manzikert army. As part of the reorganisation process, the remnants of the provincial troops of the Eastern themata (military provinces) were brought together as the Immortals, providing a new element of the tagma. The new Immortals may have been cavalry, like the bulk of the old Byzantine field army, but this is not certain.

Some contemporary documents seem to place the Athanatoi among other foreign contingents, but modern scholars usually consider the unit to have been composed of native Byzantines. A schematic diagram of the standard field camp layout of the Byzantine army in the late 10th century shows the Immortals as deployed by the Imperial tent, within an outer square of Thematic units.

The Byzantine historian Nikephoros Bryennios the Younger records that the Immortals numbered 10,000, but this is most likely an allusion to the old Persian Immortal Guard. The new unit fought under the future emperor Alexios I Komnenos in the Battle of Kalavrye (1078) against the rebel general Nikephoros Bryennios the Elder, and are mentioned in the wars against the Pechenegs in the 1090s, but disappear thereafter, along with another contemporary creation, the Archontopouloi.

== In popular culture ==
In Walter Scott's novel Count Robert of Paris the Immortals appear as rivals to the Viking or Anglo-Saxon Varangian Guard for Imperial favour.

In Rise of The Tomb Raider (2015) the "Athanatoi" or "deathless ones" are armoured warriors who speak Greek and guard the fictional city of Kitezh.

== Sources ==
- Birkenmeier, John W. (2002). The Development of the Komnenian Army: 1081–1180. Brill. ISBN 90-04-11710-5.
- Kazhdan, Alexander (1991). "Athanatoi". In Kazhdan, Alexander (ed.). The Oxford Dictionary of Byzantium. Oxford and New York: Oxford University Press. p. 220. ISBN 0-19-504652-8.
- Kühn, Hans-Joachim (1991). Die byzantinische Armee im 10. und 11. Jahrhundert: Studien zur Organisation der Tagmata (in German). Vienna: Fassbaender Verlag. ISBN 3-9005-38-23-9.
- Talbot, Alice-Mary; Sullivan, Dennis F., eds. (2005). The History of Leo the Deacon: Byzantine Military Expansion in the Tenth Century. Washington: Dumbarton Oaks. ISBN 978-0-88402-324-1.
