= Sasanian civil war of 628–632 =

Internal conflict within the Persian Sasanian Empire

Date	628–632
Location	Sasanian Empire
Result	Yazdegerd III is recognized as Shah of Iran

Belligerents
The Parsig faction The Nimruzi faction	The Pahlav faction	Shahrbaraz's army

Commanders and leaders
Piruz Khosrow; Bahman Jaduya; Mardanshah; Namdar Gushnasp	Farrukh Hormizd (executed); Rostam Farrokhzad; Farrukhzad; Jalinus; Mah-Adhur Gushnasp (executed)	Shahrbaraz (executed)

The Sasanian civil war of 628–632, also known as the Sasanian Interregnum, was a conflict in the Sasanian Empire that broke out after the execution of King of Kings Khosrow II between the nobles of different factions, notably the Parthian (Pahlav) faction, the Persian (Parsig) faction, the Nimruzi faction, and the faction of general Shahrbaraz. Rapid turnover of rulers and increasing provincial landholder power further diminished the empire. Over a period of four years and fourteen successive kings, the Sasanian Empire weakened considerably, and the power of the central authority passed into the hands of its generals, contributing to its fall.

== Background ==
Historically, Khosrow's downfall was triggered by the domestic crisis following the decisive Sasanian defeat in the Byzantine–Sasanian War of 602–628. On 25 February 628, the Shah was overthrown in a palace coup orchestrated by a coalition of feudal families, including the Ispahbudhan spahbed Farrukh Hormizd and his sons Rostam Farrokhzad and Farrukhzad. Khosrow's son, Sheroe, was proclaimed as Kavad II. To secure his throne, Kavad II executed his brothers—including the heir Mardanshah—contributing to the empire's terminal instability. Three days after his coronation, Kavad ordered Mihr Hormozd to execute his father. Kavad II died of a plague in September 628. Due to Kavad's actions, his reign is seen as a turning point in Sasanian history, and has been argued by some scholars as playing a key role in the fall of the Sasanian Empire. The overthrow and death of Khosrow culminated in the Sasanian civil war of 628–632, with the most powerful members of the nobility gaining full autonomy and starting to create their own government. The hostilities between the Persian (Parsig) and Parthian (Pahlav) noble families were also resumed, which split up the wealth of the nation. With the agreement of the Iranian nobles, he then made peace with the victorious emperor Heraclius, which allowed the Byzantines to (re)gain all their lost territories, their captured soldiers, a war indemnity, along with the True Cross and other relics that were lost in Jerusalem in 614.

Kavad also took all the properties of Farrukhzad and put him under arrest in Istakhr. During this period, Piruz Khosrow assumed the leadership of the Parsig faction, while the Ispahbudhan Farrukh Hormizd, assumed the leadership of the Pahlav faction. Kavad II later died from a devastating plague after only a few months reign on 6 September 628. He was succeeded by his eight year old son Ardashir III.

== Early phase of the civil war ==
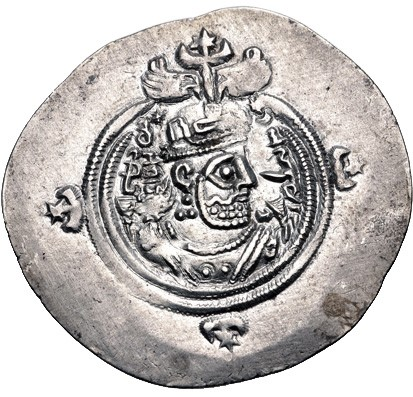
Coin of Farrukh Hormizd

During the reign of Ardashir III, Mah-Adhur Gushnasp was appointed as his minister, and administered the empire greatly. One year later, Shahrbaraz with a force of 6,000 men, marched towards Ctesiphon and besieged the city. Shahrbaraz, however, was unable to capture the city, and then made an alliance with Piruz Khosrow, the leader of the Parsig faction, and the previous minister of the Empire during the reign of Ardashir's father, Kavad II. He also made an alliance with Namdar Gushnasp, the spahbed of Nimruz. Shahrbaraz, with the aid of these two powerful figures, captured Ctesiphon, and executed Ardashir III, along with Mah-Adhur himself, including other Sasanian nobles like Ardabīl. Forty days later, Shahrbaraz was murdered by Farrukh Hormizd, who then made Boran, the daughter of Khosrow II, ascend the throne. She then appointed Farrukh as the minister of the empire.

Boran was deposed by Shapur-i Shahrvaraz, the son of Khosrow II's sister Mirhran, and the Sasanian usurper Shahrbaraz. He was shortly thereafter deposed by Piruz and his faction, who did not acknowledge his rule. Piruz crowned Azarmidokht, the sister of Boran, as monarch of Iran.

== Late phase of the civil war ==
Azarmidokht, under the advice of the nobles, recalled Farrukhzad from his arrest and invited him to serve the Sasanians in high office once again. Farrukhzad, however, declined the invitation and refused to serve under a woman. He then retired to a fire-temple in Istakhr. Farrukh Hormizd, in order to strengthen his authority and create a modus vivendi between the Pahlav and Parsig, asked Azarmidokht (who was a Parsig nominee) to marry him. Azarmidokht, however, declined. After having his proposal declined, Farrukh Hormizd "no longer shied away from the throne itself", declaring "Today I am the leader of the people and the pillar of the country of Iran." He started minting coins in the same fashion as a monarch, notably in Istakhr in Pars and Nahavand in Media. In order to deal with Farrukh Hormizd, Azarmidokht supposedly allied herself with Mihranid dynast Siyavakhsh, who was the grandson of Bahram Chobin, the famous military commander (spahbed) and briefly shah of Iran. With Siyavakhsh's aid, Azarmidokht had Farrukh Hormizd killed. Farrukh Hormizd's son Rostam Farrokhzad, who was at that time stationed in Khorasan, succeeded him as the leader of the Pahlav. In order to avenge his father, he left for Ctesiphon, "defeating every army of Azarmidokht that met". He then defeated Siyavakhsh's forces at Ctesiphon and captured the city.

Azarmidokht was shortly afterwards blinded and killed by Rostam, who restored Boran to the throne. However, in the following year a revolt broke out in Ctesiphon; while the Iranian army was occupied with other matters, the Parsig, dissatisfied with the regency of Rostam, called for the overthrow of Boran and the return of the prominent Parsig figure Bahman Jaduya, who had been dismissed by her. Boran was shortly killed, presumably from suffocation by Piruz Khosrow. Hostilities were thus resumed between the two factions. However, not long after both Rostam and Piruz Khosrow were threatened by their own men, who had become alarmed by the declining state of the country. Rostam and Piruz Khosrow thus agreed to work together once more, installing Khosrow II's grandson Yazdegerd III on the throne, putting an end to the civil war.

== Aftermath and impact ==
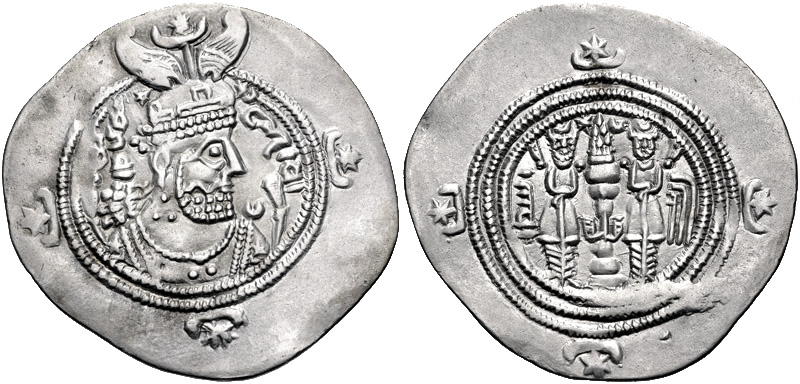
Coin of Yazdegerd III

The Sasanian Empire was greatly weakened when Yazdegerd III ascended the throne. The young king did not have the authority required to bring stability to his extensive empire, which was swiftly falling apart due to ceaseless internal conflicts between the army commanders, courtiers, and powerful members of the aristocracy, who were fighting amongst themselves and wiping out each other. Many of the governors of the empire had proclaimed independence and carved out their own kingdom. The governors of the provinces of Mazun and Yemen had already asserted their independence during the civil war of 628–632, thus resulting in the disintegration of Sasanian rule in the Arabian Peninsula, which was uniting under the banner of Islam. The empire came to resemble the Parthian feudal system that existed before the fall of the Arsacid Empire.

Yazdegerd, although being acknowledged as the rightful monarch by both the Parsig and Pahlav factions, did not seem to have held sway over all of his empire. Indeed, during the first years of his rule coins were only minted in Pars, Sakastan, and Khuzestan, approximately corresponding to the regions of the southwest (Xwarwarān) and southeast (Nēmrōz), where the Parsig was based. The Pahlav, who were mainly based in the northern portion of the empire, refused to mint coins of him. The empire was also at the same time invaded on all fronts; by the Göktürks in the east, and by Khazars in the west, who raided Armenia and Adurbadagan. The Sasanian army had been heavily weakened due to the war with the Byzantines and internal conflict. The circumstances were so chaotic, and the condition of the nation so alarming, that "the Persians openly spoke of the imminent downfall of their empire, and saw its portents in natural calamities." The empire would soon meet its end at the hands of an Arab invasion, during which Yazdegerd was killed in 651, possibly at the instigation of one his own subjects.

== Sources ==
- Al-Tabari, Abu Ja'far Muhammad ibn Jarir (1985–2007). Ehsan Yar-Shater (ed.). The History of Al-Ṭabarī. Vol. 40 vols. Albany, NY: State University of New York Press.
- Daryaee, Touraj (2014). Sasanian Persia: The Rise and Fall of an Empire. I.B.Tauris. pp. 1–240. ISBN 978-0857716668.
- Gignoux, Ph. (1987). "Āzarmīgduxt". Encyclopaedia Iranica, Vol. III, Fasc. 2. p. 190.
- Kia, Mehrdad (2016). The Persian Empire: A Historical Encyclopedia [2 volumes]: A Historical Encyclopedia. ABC-CLIO. ISBN 978-1610693912.
- Morony, M. (1986). "ʿARAB ii. Arab conquest of Iran". Encyclopaedia Iranica, Vol. II, Fasc. 2. pp. 203–210.
- Oman, Charles (1893). Europe, 476-918. Macmillan.
- Pourshariati, Parvaneh (2008). Decline and Fall of the Sasanian Empire: The Sasanian-Parthian Confederacy and the Arab Conquest of Iran. London and New York: I.B. Tauris. ISBN 978-1-84511-645-3.
- Shahbazi, A. Shapur (2005). "Sasanian dynasty". Encyclopaedia Iranica, Online Edition.
