= Battle of Ctesiphon =

Battle, fall, siege, or sack of Ctesiphon may refer to:

- Battle of Ctesiphon (116), part of the Roman–Parthian Wars (Trajan v. Osroes I)
- Battle of Ctesiphon (165), part of the Roman–Parthian Wars (Lucius Verus v. Vologases IV)
- Battle of Ctesiphon (198), part of the Roman–Parthian Wars (Septimius Severus v. Vologases V)
- Siege of Ctesiphon (263), part of the Roman–Sasanian Wars (Odaenathus v. Shapur I)
- Battle of Ctesiphon (283), part of the Roman–Sasanian Wars (Carus v. Bahram II)
- Battle of Ctesiphon (298), part of the Roman–Sasanian Wars (Galerius v. Narseh)
- Battle of Ctesiphon (363), part of the Roman–Sasanian Wars (Julian v. Shapur II)
- Siege of Ctesiphon (629), part of the Sasanian Interregnum (Shahrbaraz v. Ardashir III)
- Siege of Ctesiphon (637), part of the Muslim conquest of Persia (Umar v. Yazdegerd III)
- Battle of Ctesiphon (1915), part of World War I (British Empire v. Ottoman Empire)
