= Namdar Gushnasp =

7th-century Sassanid military leader

Namdar Gushnasp was a leading Iranian military leader in 7th-century Sasanian Iran, who played a major role during the early stages of the Sasanian civil war of 628–632. He was the leader of the Nimruzi, a faction named after the southeastern frontier region of Nemroz, where the faction was situated.

== Biography ==
Nemroz was originally under the governorship of the military commander (spahbed) Shahrbaraz. However, when the latter rebelled during the late reign of king (shah) Khosrow II, he was dismissed from the post. Not long afterwards, Khosrow II was overthrown and executed by his son Kavad II, resulting in a power vacuum in the region. A faction took the opportunity to take control of the region under the leadership of Namdar Gushnasp, who assumed the title of spahbed, even if the title did not have any significance during the civil war that followed after Khosrow II's death. With his fall, the most powerful members of the nobility gained full autonomy and started to create their own government. The hostilities between the Persian (Parsig) and Parthian (Pahlav) noble families were also resumed, which broke up the wealth of the nation.

A few months later, the devastating Plague of Sheroe swept through the western Sasanian provinces. Half the population, including Kavad II himself, perished. He was succeeded by his eight-year-old son, who became Ardashir III. Ardashir's ascension was supported by both the Pahlav, Parsig, and the Nimruzi. However, sometime in 629, Namdar Gushnasp and the Nimruzi withdrew their support for the shah, and started to conspire with Shahrbaraz to overthrow him. The Pahlav, under their leader Farrukh Hormizd of the Ispahbudhan clan, responded by supporting Khosrow II's daughter Boran as the new ruler of Iran, who subsequently started minting coins in the Pahlav areas of Amol, Nishapur, Gurgan and Ray. On 27 April 630, Ardashir III was killed by Shahrbaraz, who ascended the throne.

== Sources ==
- Pourshariati, Parvaneh (2008). Decline and Fall of the Sasanian Empire: The Sasanian-Parthian Confederacy and the Arab Conquest of Iran (PDF). London and New York: I.B. Tauris. ISBN 978-1-84511-645-3.
- Shahbazi, A. Shapur (2005). "Sasanian dynasty". Encyclopaedia Iranica.
