= Mah-Adhur Gushnasp =

Iranian nobleman of the Sasanian era

Mah-Adhur Gushnasp (Persian: ماه‌ آذرگشنسپ), also known by the Arabicized form of Mahadharjushnas, was an Iranian nobleman who served as the wuzurg framadār (vizier or prime minister) of the Sasanian Empire during the reign of the child ruler Ardashir III (r. 628–629).

== Biography ==
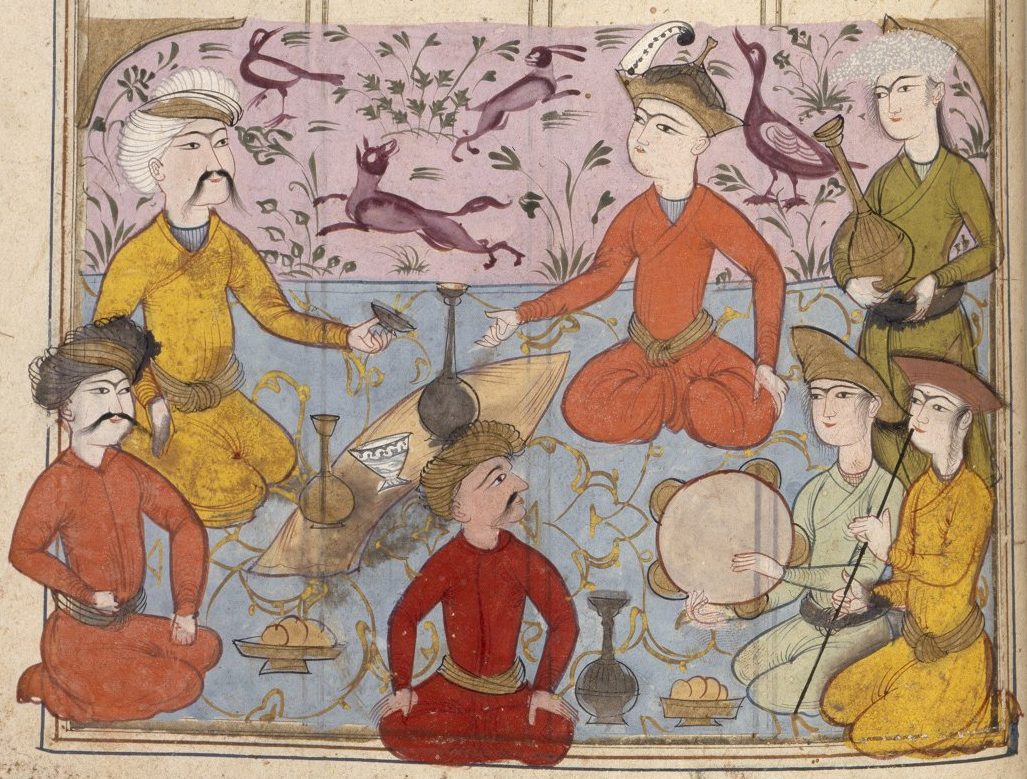
Court of Ardashir III.

Mah-Adhur was the son of a certain Jushnas (Gushnasp), and an unnamed Ispahbudhan noblewoman, who was the sister of Vistahm and Vinduyih. Mah-Adhur Gushnasp had a brother named Narsi, and was a cousin of Khosrow II (r. 591–628), whose mother was also a sibling of the two Ispahbudhan brothers.

He is first mentioned during the accession of the eight-year old Ardashir III to the Sasanian throne on 6 September 628, where he was elected as wuzurg framadār of the young ruler. According to the medieval Persian historian al-Tabari, Mah-Adhur greatly administered the empire; "Mahadharjushnas carried on the administration of the kingdom in [such] an excellent fashion, [and with such] firm conduct, [that] no one would have been aware of Ardashir III's youthfulness." However, this did not mean that the Sasanian Empire was peaceful and secure—in fact, "local chiefs and army leaders had gained too much power to obey the central government; imperial administration was disintegrating, and the Arabs and the Turks were attacking Iranian border regions" (A. Shahbazi).

One year later, the former Sasanian military leader Shahrbaraz, with a force of 6,000 men, marched towards Ctesiphon and besieged the city. He was, however, unable to capture the city, and therefore made an alliance with Piruz Khosrow, the leader of the Parsig faction, and the previous wuzurg framadār of the empire during the reign of Ardashir's father, Kavadh II (r. 628). He also made an alliance with Namdar Gushnasp, the spahbed ("army chief") of Nemroz. Shahrbaraz, with the aid of these two powerful figures, captured Ctesiphon and executed Ardashir III, along with Mah-Adhur himself, and other prominent nobles of the empire including a certain Ardabīl. 40 days later, Shahrbaraz was murdered by Mah-Adhur's paternal cousin Farrukh Hormizd, who then made Boran, the daughter of Khosrow II, the new ruler of the empire.

== Offspring ==
Mah-Adhur's two sons, Kavadh and Anoshagan, later clashed with the Arabs twice in 633, first at the battle of Chains, then finally at battle of River (also known as battle of Al Madhar), where they were killed by the troops of the Arab general Khalid ibn al-Walid.

== Sources ==
- Pourshariati, Parvaneh (2008). Decline and Fall of the Sasanian Empire: The Sasanian-Parthian Confederacy and the Arab Conquest of Iran. London and New York: I.B. Tauris. ISBN 978-1-84511-645-3.
- Shahbazi, A. Sh. (1986). "ARDAŠĪR III". Encyclopaedia Iranica, Vol. II, Fasc. 4. pp. 381–382.

Preceded by Piruz Khosrow	Wuzurg framadār of the Sasanian Empire; 6 September 628 – 27 April 629	Succeeded by Unknown; Farrukh Hormizd occupies the office 40 days later
