= Rostam Farrokhzad =

Sasanian military general (died 636)

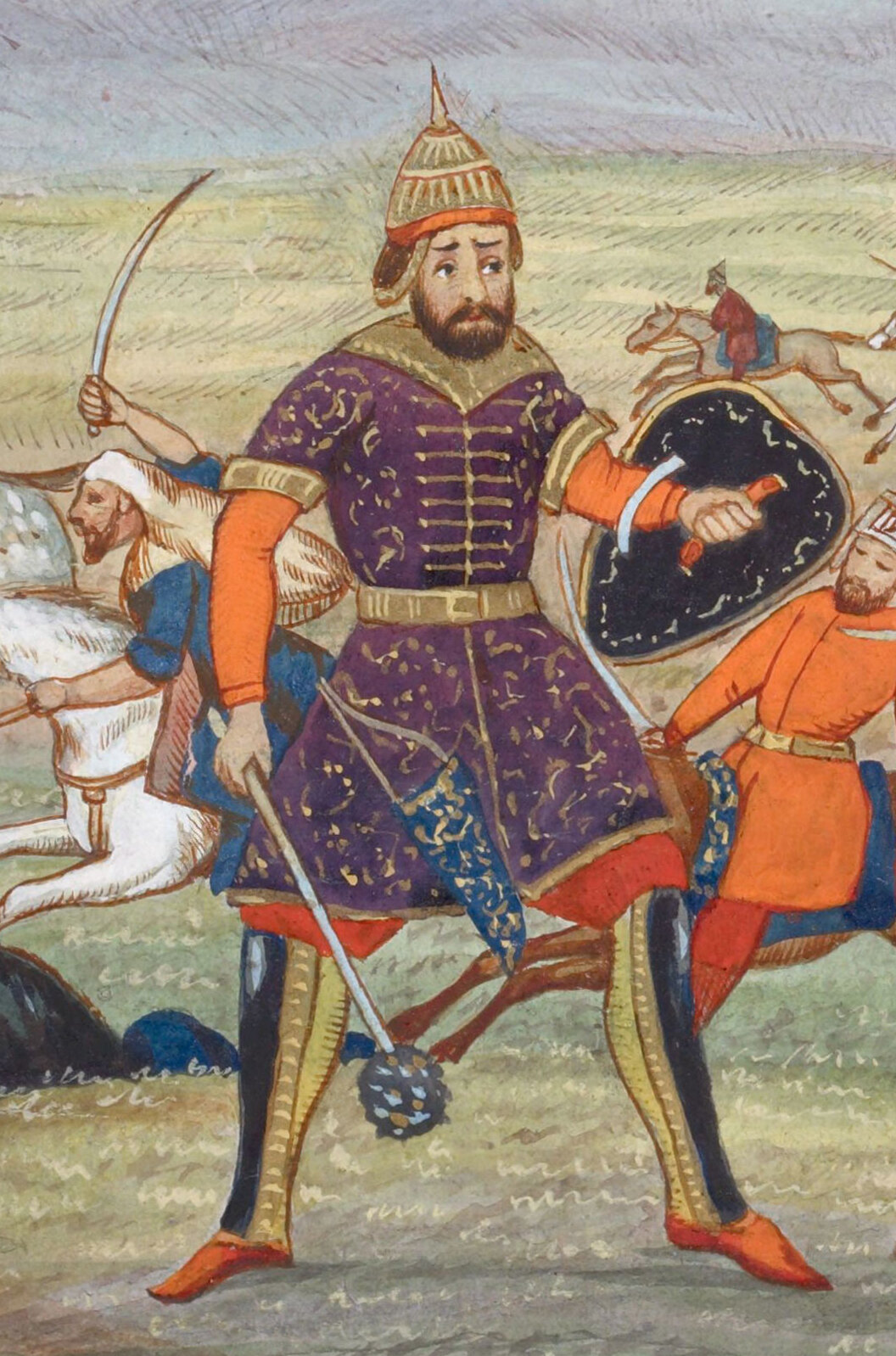
- 17th-century Shahnameh illustration of Rostam Farrokhzad
- Died: 19 November 636 al-Qadisiyyah
- Relatives: Farrukh Hormizd (father); Farrukhzad (brother)
- Military career
- Allegiance: Sasanian Empire
- Commands: Spahbed of Adurbadagan (631–636)
- Conflicts: Battle of al-Qadisiyyah †

Rostam Farrokhzād (Persian: رستم فرخزاد) was a dynast from the Ispahbudhan family, who served as the spahbed ("military marshal") of the northwestern quarter (kust) of Adurbadagan under the Sasanian monarchs Boran (r. 630–630, 631–632) and Yazdegerd III (r. 632–651). Rostam is remembered as a historical figure, a character in the Persian epic poem Shahnameh ("Book of Kings"), and as a folk hero in much of greater Iran.

== Background ==
Rostam was a member of the House of Ispahbudhan, one of the Seven Great Houses of Iran, which formed the elite aristocracy of the Sasanian Empire; the family traced its descent back to military marshals (spahbed), and occupied important offices in the realm. According to a romanticized legend about their origin, a daughter of the Parthian/Arsacid king Phraates IV (r. 37–2 BC), named Koshm, married a "general of all Iranians"; their offspring bore the title of "Aspahpet Pahlav", later forming the Ispahbudhan clan. Through their Arsacid lineage, the Ispahbudhan claimed to be descendants of the Kayanian kings Dara II and Esfandiyar.

Under the Sasanians, the Ispahbudhan enjoyed such a high status that they were acknowledged as "kin and partners of the Sasanians". Indeed, Rostam's father Farrukh Hormizd was the first-cousin of the Sasanian King of Kings (shahanshah) Khosrow II (r. 590–628), while his great-grandfather Shapur was the first cousin of shahanshah Khosrow I (r. 531–579). Although the hereditary homeland of the Ispahbudhan seems to have been Khorasan, the family in the course of time came to rule the northwestern quarter (kust) of Adurbadagan (not to be confused with the namesake province of Adurbadagan). Rostam's birthplace is hence reported to be in Armenia, Adurbadagan, Hamadan, or Ray. Rostam had a brother named Farrukhzad, who was active in Ctesiphon and enjoyed a great status there, reportedly being a favourite of Khosrow II.

== War with the Byzantine Empire ==
Map of the northwestern Sasanian province of Adurbadagan

In 602, the Byzantine emperor Maurice (r. 582–602) was murdered by his political rival Phocas. As a result, Khosrow II proceeded to declare war, ostensibly to avenge the death of Maurice. During the two decade war, Khosrow was initially successful, conquering the Roman provinces in the Near East, including Egypt. During the third phase of the war (624), however, the tables turned heavily, with the new Byzantine emperor Heraclius conquering Transcaucasia, thus leaving the northwestern Sasanian realm exposed. During this period, many Iranian grandees became dissatisfied with the rule of Khosrow II, not only due to the Byzantine victories but also his policies.

This included Rostam, who at the head of 10,000 soldiers, rebelled in the Adurbadagan province. Around the same time, Heraclius invaded Adurbadagan, sacking the city of Ganzak. The modern historian Parvaneh Pourshariati proposes two possibilities behind the success of Heraclius' invasion of Adurbadagan; one being that the significance of the rebellion allowed him to attack the province; the other being that Farrukh Hormizd stopped supporting Khosrow II, as a result allowing Heraclius to attack Adurbadagan. By 627, the distinguished Mihranid general Shahrbaraz had mutinied, while Farrukh Hormizd secretly conspired with him against Khosrow II. The following year, Khosrow II was overthrown by several powerful factions within the empire, which included; Shahrbaraz, who represented the Mihran family; the House of Ispahbudhan represented by Farrukh Hormizd and his two sons Rostam and Farrukhzad; the Armenian faction represented by Varaztirots II Bagratuni; and the Kanarang. The factions installed Khosrow II's son Kavad II on the throne, who soon had his father executed.

== Civil war in Iran ==
=== Reign of Kavad II, Ardashir III and Shahrbaraz ===
The fall of Khosrow II culminated in the Sasanian civil war of 628–632, with the most powerful members of the nobility gaining full autonomy and starting to create their own government. The hostilities between the Persian (Parsig) and Parthian (Pahlav) noble-families were also resumed, which broke up the wealth of the nation. A few months later, the devastating Plague of Sheroe swept through the western Sasanian provinces. Half the population, including Kavad II himself, perished. He was succeeded by his eight-year-old son, who became Ardashir III. Ardashir's ascension was supported by both the Pahlav, Parsig, and a third major faction named the Nimruzi. However, sometime in 629, the Nimruzi withdrew their support for the king, and started to conspire with Shahrbaraz to overthrow him. The Pahlav, under their leader Farrukh Hormizd, began supporting Khosrow II's daughter Boran as the new ruler of Iran, who subsequently started minting coins in the Pahlav areas of Amol, Nishapur, Gurgan and Ray. On 27 April 630, Ardashir III was killed by Shahrbaraz, who in turn was murdered, after a reign of forty days, in a coup by Farrukh Hormizd. Farrukh Hormizd then helped Boran ascend the throne, sometime in late June 630.

=== Reign of Boran, Shapur-i Shahvaraz and Azarmidokht ===
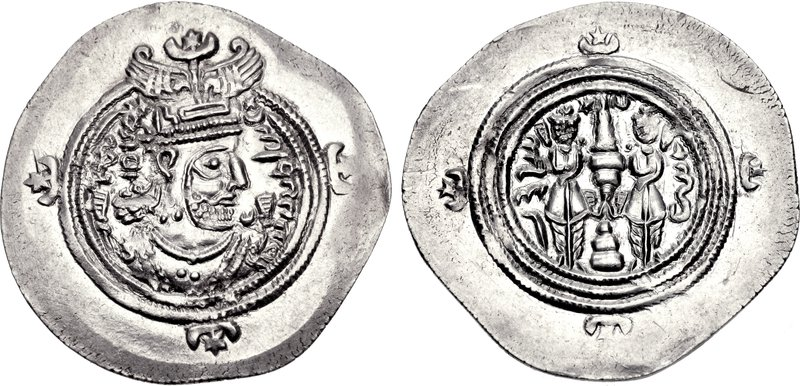
Drachma of Azarmidokht with the bust of her father Khosrow II to the left

Boran's accession was most likely due to her being the only remaining legitimate heir of the empire able to rule, along with her sister Azarmidokht. However, she was deposed in 630, and Shapur-i Shahrvaraz, the son of Shahrbaraz and a sister of Khosrow II, was made ruler of Iran. When he was not recognized by the Parsig faction of the powerful general Piruz Khosrow, he was deposed in favor of Azarmidokht. Farrukh Hormizd, in order to strengthen his authority and create a harmonious modus vivendi between the Pahlav and Parsig families, asked Azarmidokht (who was a Parsig nominee) to marry him. Not daring to refuse, she had him killed with the aid of the Mihranid aristocrat Siyavakhsh, who was the grandson of Bahram Chobin, the famous military commander and briefly monarch of Iran. Rostam, who was at that time stationed in Khorasan, succeeded him as the leader of the Pahlav. In order to avenge his father, he left for Ctesiphon, in the words of the 9th century historian Sayf ibn Umar, "defeating every army of Azarmidokht that he met". He then defeated Siyavakhsh's forces at Ctesiphon and captured the city. Azarmidokht was shortly afterwards blinded and killed by Rostam, who restored Boran to the throne in June 631. Boran complained to him about the state of the empire, which was at that time in a state of frailty and decline. She reportedly invited him to administer its affairs, and so allowed him to assume overall power.

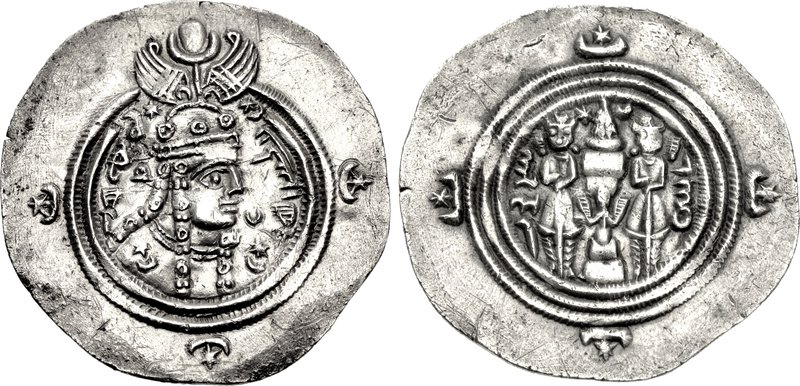
Drachma of Boran

A settlement was reportedly made between the family of Boran and Rostam: according to Sayf, it stated that the queen should "entrust him [i.e., Rostam] with the rule for ten years,” at which point sovereignty would return "to the family of Sasan if they found any of their male offspring, and if not, then to their women". Boran deemed the agreement appropriate, and had the factions of the country summoned (including the Parsig), where she declared Rostam as both the leader of the country and its military commander. The Parsig faction agreed, with Piruz Khosrow being entrusted to administer the country alongside Rostam.

The Parsig agreed to work with the Pahlav because of the fragility and decline of Iran, and also because their Mihranid collaborators had been temporarily defeated by Rostam. However, the cooperation between the Parsig and Pahlav would prove short-lived, due to the unequal conditions between the two factions, with Rostam's faction having a much more significant portion of power under the approval of Boran. In the following year a revolt broke out in Ctesiphon. While the imperial army was occupied with other matters, the Parsig, dissatisfied with the regency of Rostam, called for the overthrow of Boran and the return of the prominent Parsig figure Bahman Jaduya, who had been dismissed by her. Boran was killed shortly after; she was presumably strangled by Piruz Khosrow. Hostilities were thus resumed between the two factions. Not long afterwards, both Rostam and Piruz Khosrow were threatened by their own men, who had become alarmed by the declining state of the country. Rostam and Piruz Khosrow thus agreed to work together once more, installing Boran's nephew Yazdegerd III (r. 632–651) on the throne, and so putting an end to the civil war.

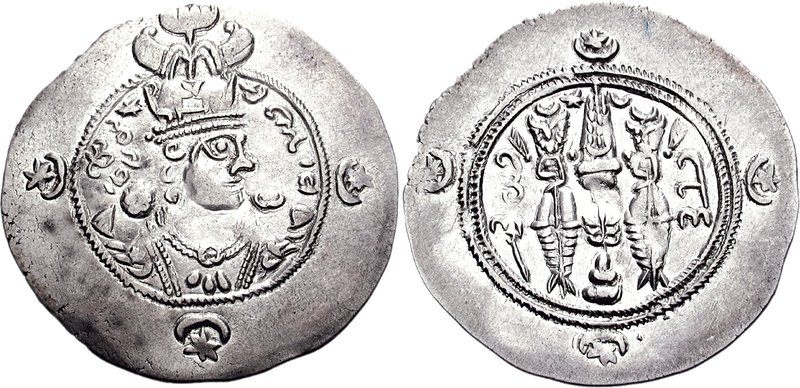
Drachma of a young Yazdegerd III, the last Sasanian monarch of Iran

=== Accession of Yazdegerd III and end of the civil war ===
Yazdegerd was crowned in the Anahid fire-temple in Istakhr, where he had been hiding during the civil war. The temple was the very place where the first Sasanian shahanshah Ardashir I (r. 224–242) had crowned himself, indicating that the reason behind Yazdegerd's coronation at the same place was due to hopes for a rejuvenation of the empire. He was almost the last living member of the House of Sasan. Most scholars agree that Yazdegerd was eight years old at his coronation. At his accession, he assigned Rostam with the defense of the empire, telling him "Today you are the [most prominent] man among the Persians." Although being acknowledged as the rightful monarch by both the Parsig and Pahlav factions, Yazdegerd did not seem to have held sway over all of his empire. Indeed, during the first years of his rule coins were only minted in Pars, Sakastan, and Khuzestan, approximately corresponding to the regions of the southwest (Xwarwarān) and southeast (Nēmrōz), where the Parsig was based. The Pahlav, who were mainly based in the northern portion of the empire, refused to mint coins in his name.

=== The Arab invasion of the Sasanian Empire ===
Throughout this period the Muslim conquests had slowly been penetrating the south-western frontiers under the second Rashidun caliph Umar. The Persians had repeatedly blocked this advance and in 634 the caliph's army suffered a seemingly decisive defeat at the Battle of the Bridge. The Sasanian general Bahman Jaduya, though, was ordered back to Ctesiphon by Rostam in order to put down a revolt in his own capital city. Caliph Umar's forces retreated, only to launch a successful assault three years later.

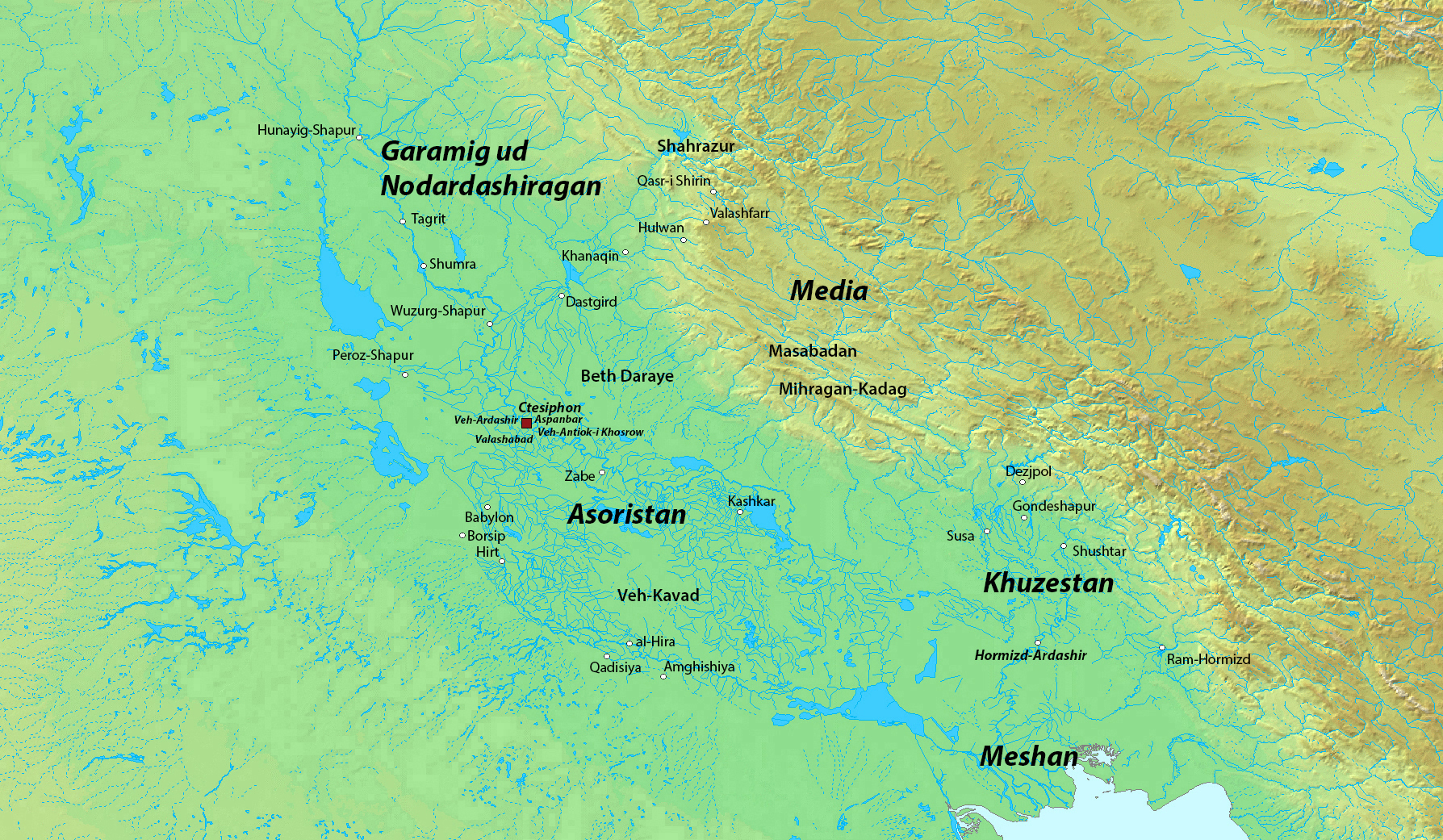
Map of Sasanian Mesopotamia and its surroundings.

In 636, Yazdegerd III ordered Rostam Farrokhzad to subdue the Muslim Arabs invading Iran and then told him: "Today you are the [most prominent] man among the Iranians. You see that the people of Iran have not faced a situation like this since the family of Ardashir I assumed power." Yazdegerd then said: "the Arabs and their exploits since they have camped at Qadisiyyah and ... what the Iranians have suffered at their hands."

Rostam then replied by saying that the Arabs were "a pack of wolves, falling upon unsuspecting shepherds and annihilating them."

However, Yazdegerd then argued with him and said: "It is not like that. I put the question to you in the expectation that you would describe them clearly and that then I would be able to reinforce you so that you might act according to the [real situation]. But you did not say the right thing." Yazdegerd "then compared the Arabs to an eagle who looked upon a mountain where birds take shelter at night and stay in their nests at the foot of it. In the morning the birds recognized that the eagle is preying upon them. Whenever a bird became separated from the rest, the eagle snatched him. When the birds saw him [doing this], they did not take off out of fear ... If they had taken off all at once, they would have repelled him. The worst thing that could happen to them would be that all would escape save one. But if each group acted in turn and took off separately, they all perished. This was the similarity between them and the Iranians."

Rostam, however, did not agree with Yazdegerd and then told him: "O king, let me [act in my own way]. The Arabs still dread the Iranians as long as you do not arouse them against me. It is to be hoped that my good fortune will last and that God will save us the trouble." Rostam then said: "We should employ the right ruse," he insisted. "In war, patience is superior to haste, and the order of the day is now patience. To fight one army after another is better than a single [and total] defeat and is also harder on our enemy." Yazdegerd, however, was too young and stubborn to listen to Rostam.

Before the Muslim Arabs and the Sasanians engaged in battle, Rostam tried to negotiate with the Arabs. He therefore sent them a letter saying:

"In the presence of the pure Lord of the world we may not stand without fear and reverence, for it is through him that the revolving heavens endure and all his governance is justice and charity. May there be blessings from him on the monarch who is the adornment of his crown, throne and seal, who by his Farr holds Ahriman [the spirit of evil] enthralled, the lord of the sword and the sublime crown. This deplorable vent has occurred and to no purpose has this grievous thing, this struggle, come to pass. Tell me this, who is your king? What man are you and what is your religion and way of life? Over whom do you seek to triumph, you, naked commander of a naked army? With a loaf of bread you are satisfied yet remain hungry. You have neither elephants nor platforms nor baggage nor gear. Mere existence in Iran would be enough for you, since crown and ring belong to another, one who possesses elephants and treasures, Farr and sublime rank. His forebears from ancestor to ancestor have all been renowned kings. When he is visible, there is no moon in the sky. There is no monarch of his stature on earth. When he laughs at a feast with his lips open and teeth shining like silver, he gives away what is the ransom of an Arab chief without any loss to his treasury. His hounds, panthers and falcons number twelve thousand, all dight with golden bells and earrings. From a diet of camel's milk and lizards the Arabs have come so far as to aspire to the Kayanian throne. Is there no shame in your eyes? Do feeling and honour not lie on the path of your wisdom? With a countenance such as yours, such birth, such sentiments and spirit, do you aspire to such a crown and such a throne? If you seek to possess some portion of the world you will not make over-boastful claims. Send us some man to speak for you, someone of experience, a warrior of understanding, of the kind who may tell us what your religion is and who your guide is upon the royal throne. I shall send a cavalier to the Shah requesting him to grant you what you desire. And now do not attempt to make war on so great a monarch, for it is in his hands that the outcome of it will lie. Observe well the contents of his letter filled with good counsel; do not bind up the eyes and ears of wisdom."

After having read the letter, the Arabs did as Rostam asked and sent a man named Zuhrah. However, the negotiations with him did not go well, which made Rostam ask for another messenger, and thus a man named Mughirah ibn Shubah was sent. Rostam then told Mughirah: "We are firmly established in the land, victorious over our enemies, and noble among nations. None of the kings has our power, honor, dominion." While Rostam was talking, Mughirah interrupted him and said: "If you need our protection, then be under our protection, and pay the poll tax out of hand in humility; otherwise it is the sword." Feeling greatly insulted and angered, Rostam threatened Mughirah and said: "Dawn will not break upon you tomorrow before I kill you all".

Rostam, while preparing to face the Arab army, wrote a letter to his brother Farrukhzad, telling him to gather an army and then go to Azerbaijan where he should pray for him. Rostam also reminded Farrukhzad that Yazdegerd III was the only legacy left from the Sasanians. Rostam then set out from Ctesiphon in command of a large Sasanian force to confront the Arab-Muslim army of Caliph Umar on the western bank of the Euphrates River at the plains of al-Qādisiyyah, a now abandoned city in southern Mesopotamia, southwest of al-Hillah and al-Kūfah in Iraq.

=== Death ===
There are multiple accounts detailing the death of Rostam, but all of them state that he perished during the battle.

One account states that Rostam was found dead in the sandstorm with over 600 wounds on his body. However, the Persians were not aware of his death and continued to fight. The Sassanid right wing counter-attacked and gained its lost position, as the Muslims' left wing retreated back to their original position. The Muslims' left center, now under Qa’qa's command, when denied the support of their left wing, also retreated back to its original position. A version from al-Ya'qubi further elaborates that Dhiraar bin Al-Azwar, Tulayha, Amru bin Ma'adi Yakrib and Kurt bin Jammah al-Abdi were the men that discovered the corpse of Rostam. Two additional narratives also exist, but both have been suggested to likely be the untrustworthy inventions of later story-tellers intending to mock and romanticize the incident respectively. They are as follows:

1. During the final day of the battle, there was a heavy sandstorm facing the Sasanian army. Rostam used a camel loaded with weapons as shelter to avoid the sandstorm. Not knowing that Rostam was behind, Hilal ibn Ullafa accidentally cut the girdle of the load on the camel. The weapons fell on Rostam and broke his back leaving him half dead and paralyzed. Hilal beheaded Rostam and shouted "I swear by the God of Kaaba that I have killed Rostam." Shocked by the head of their legendary leader dangling before their eyes, the Sassanid soldiers were demoralized, and the commanders lost control of the army. Many Sassanid soldiers were slain in the chaos, with some escaping through the river, and finally the rest of the army surrendered. However, due to the presence of inconsistencies, literary devices, and comedic elements, it has been suggested that this account is unreliable and highly improbable, with even the identity the Arab soldier that delivered the death blow being disputed.
2. A second account, likely developed in response to the first, instead has Rostam face the Arab commander, Sa'd, in personal combat. During the fight, Rostam is temporarily blinded by the sandstorm which gives his opponent an opportunity to strike and kill him.

=== Aftermath ===
The defeat of Rostam's army heavily demoralized the people of the Sasanian Empire. Soon, after Rostam's death, many more Sasanian veterans were killed, including: Piruz Khosrow, Shahrvaraz Jadhuyih, Mardanshah in 642, and Siyavakhsh and Muta of Dailam in 643. In 651, Yazdegerd III was murdered by Mahuy Suri, and the Arabs conquered Khorasan soon after.

== Personality and skills ==
The Shahnameh describes him as: "A sagacious, warlike and one who had been a conqueror. He was a calculator of the stars, of great perception; and he listened deeply to what his counsellors advised."

Christensen describes him as: "A man endowed with extraordinary energy, a good administrator and a fine general."

== Family tree ==
Legend
Orange	King of Kings	Yellow	King

Bawi
Shapur
Vinduyih	Vistahm
Farrukh Hormizd	Tiruyih	Vinduyih
Rostam Farrokhzad	Farrukhzad
Shahram	Surkhab I	Isfandyadh	Bahram	Farrukhan

== Sources ==
- Daryaee, Touraj (2010). "When the End is Near: Barbarized Armies and Barracks Kings of Late Antique Iran". Ancient and Middle Iranian studies: proceedings of the 6th European Conference of Iranian Studies, held in Vienna, 18–22 September 2007. Vol. Iranica. Harrassowitz. pp. 43–52. ISBN 9783447064224.
- Daryaee, Touraj (2014). Sasanian Persia: The Rise and Fall of an Empire. I.B.Tauris. ISBN 978-0-85771-666-8.
- Daryaee, Touraj (2018). "Boran". In Nicholson, Oliver (ed.). The Oxford Dictionary of Late Antiquity. Oxford: Oxford University Press. ISBN 978-0-19-866277-8.
- Ferdowsi (27 April 2012). The Epic of the Kings (RLE Iran B): Shah-Nama the national epic of Persia. Taylor & Francis. ISBN 9781136840777.
- Frye, R. N. (1983), "Chapter 4", The political history of Iran under the Sasanians, The Cambridge History of Iran, vol. 3, Cambridge University Press, ISBN 978-0-521-20092-9
- Gignoux, Ph. (1987). "Āzarmīgduxt". Encyclopaedia Iranica, Vol. III, Fasc. 2. p. 190.
- Howard-Johnston, James (2010). "Ḵosrow II". Encyclopaedia Iranica, Online Edition.
- Kia, Mehrdad (2016). The Persian Empire: A Historical Encyclopedia. ABC-CLIO. ISBN 978-1610693912. (2 volumes)
- Lewental, D. Gershon (2017a). "The Death of Rostam: Literary representations of Iranian identity in early Islam". Iranian Studies. XI (2): 223–245. doi:10.1080/00210862.2016.1248813. S2CID 164587990.
- Lewental, D. Gershon (2017b). "Rostam b. Farroḵ-Hormozd". Encyclopaedia Iranica.
- Pourshariati, Parvaneh (2008). Decline and Fall of the Sasanian Empire: The Sasanian-Parthian Confederacy and the Arab Conquest of Iran. London and New York: I.B. Tauris. ISBN 978-1-84511-645-3.
- Shahbazi, A. Shapur (1989). "Besṭām o Bendōy". Encyclopaedia Iranica, Vol. IV, Fasc. 2. pp. 180–182.
- Shahbazi, A. Shapur (2005). "Sasanian dynasty". Encyclopaedia Iranica.

Preceded by Farrukh Hormizd	Spahbed of Adurbadagan and Khorasan; 631 – 636	Succeeded by Farrukhzad
