= Siege of Ctesiphon (629) =

Part of the Sasanian civil war of 628–632

Coordinates: 33°05′37″N 44°34′50″E

- Part of Sasanian civil war of 628–632
| Date | 27 April 629 |
| Location | Ctesiphon, Sasanian Empire |
| Result | Shahrbaraz victory; Shahrbaraz becomes Shahanshah of the Sasanian Empire |

Belligerents
| Shahrbaraz forces Allies: Parsig faction Nimruzi faction | Sasanian Empire |

Commanders and leaders
| Shahrbaraz; Piruz Khosrow; Namdar Gushnasp | Ardashir III (executed); Ardabīl (executed); Mah-Adhur Gushnasp (executed) |

Strength
| 6,000 | Unknown |

Casualties and losses
| Unknown | Unknown |

The siege of Ctesiphon took place on 27 April 629 between the forces of Shahrbaraz and Ardashir III. Shahrbaraz managed to capture Ctesiphon with a small force, revealing to all the weakness of the Sasanian Empire.

== Background ==
In 602, the last Byzantine-Sasanian war began; it was the most devastating of the series of wars fought between the two empires. In 618, Khosrau II sent Shahrbaraz to conquer Egypt; one year later the Sasanians managed to capture Alexandria, the capital of Byzantine Egypt. After the fall of Alexandria, the Sasanians gradually extended their rule southwards along the Nile. By 621, the province was securely in Sasanian hands.

Egypt would remain in Sasanian hands for 10 years, run by general Shahrbaraz from Alexandria. As the new Roman emperor, Heraclius, reversed the tide and defeated Khosrau II, Shahrbaraz was ordered to evacuate the province, but refused. In the end, Heraclius, trying both to recover Egypt and to sow disunion amongst the Iranians, offered to help Shahrbaraz seize the Sasanian throne for himself. An agreement was reached, and in the spring of 629, the Sasanian troops began leaving Egypt.

== Siege ==
Luckily for Shahrbaraz, a civil war began in 628 that divided the resources of the Sasanian Empire, and a devastating plague in the western provinces killed half of the population along with Kavadh II, weakening the empire. Shahrbaraz marched towards Ctesiphon with 6,000 men, besieged it and then captured it, betraying the Sasanian nobles and killing many of them, including two notable ones named Ardabīl and Mah-Adhur Gushnasp.

== Aftermath ==
After capturing Ctesiphon, Shahrbaraz killed Ardashir III and took the throne for himself. However, his reign did not last long, because he was killed by Sasanian nobles after forty days, and two daughters of Khosrau II reigned in succession.

== Sources ==
- Dodgeon, Michael H.; Greatrex, Geoffrey; Lieu, Samuel N. C. (2002). The Roman Eastern Frontier and the Persian Wars (Part I, 226–363 AD). Routledge. pp. 196–97. ISBN 0-415-00342-3.
- Frye, R. N. (1993). "The Political History of Iran under the Sassanids". In Yarshater, Ehsan; Bailey, Harold (eds.). The Cambridge History of Iran. Cambridge University Press. ISBN 978-0-521-20092-9.
- Howard-Johnston, James (2006). East Rome, Sasanian Persia And the End of Antiquity: Historiographical And Historical Studies. Ashgate Publishing. ISBN 0-86078-992-6.
- Pourshariati, Parvaneh (2008). Decline and Fall of the Sasanian Empire: The Sasanian-Parthian Confederacy and the Arab Conquest of Iran. London and New York: I.B. Tauris. ISBN 978-1-84511-645-3.
