= Sur Saxwan =

Sūr Saxwan ("Banquet Speech") is a Middle Persian document regarding a court banquet that took place in Sasanian Iran. The reference of four generals (spahbeds), the four frontier regions established with the military reforms of king (shah) Kavad I and his son Khosrow I, indicates that the document was made between the 6th and the 7th centuries.

== Sources ==
- Daryaee, Touraj (2017). "Sūr Saxwan". Encyclopaedia Iranica.
