= Juvansher =

- King of Kings of Iranians and non-Iranians

Shahanshah of the Sasanian Empire
- Reign: 630
- Predecessor: Shahrbaraz
- Successor: Boran (in Ctesiphon); Hormizd VI (in Nisibis)
- Died: 630
- House: House of Sasan
- Father: Khosrow II
- Mother: Gordiya
- Religion: Zoroastrianism

Javanshir (Persian: جوانشیر), also known by his Middle Persian name Juvansher (meaning young lion) was the son of Khosrow II, and Gordiya, the sister of Bahram Chobin. The 9th-century historian Dinawari mentions him as ruling before the Sasanian queen Boran. This would mean that he had managed to avoid Kavad II's slaughter of his brothers. This, however, remains obscure, and no evidence of him being represented in Sasanian coinage has been found.

== Sources ==
- Al-Tabari, Abu Ja'far Muhammad ibn Jarir (1985–2007). Ehsan Yar-Shater (ed.). The History of Al-Ṭabarī. Vol. V. Albany, NY: State University of New York Press. ISBN 978-0-7914-4355-2.
