= Kavad II =

Shahanshah of the Sasanian Empire in 628

Kavad II; 𐭪𐭥𐭠𐭲
- King of Kings of Iranians and non-Iranians
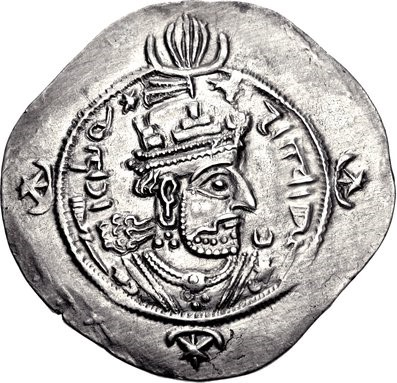
- Silver drachma of Kavad II with the mint signature "AYLAN"

Shahanshah of the Sasanian Empire
- Reign: 25 February 628 – Summer/Autumn 628
- Predecessor: Khosrow II
- Successor: Ardashir III
- Born: after 590
- Died: Summer/Autumn 628
- Spouse: Anzoy the Roman; Boran
- Issue: Ardashir III
- House: House of Sasan
- Father: Khosrow II
- Mother: Maria
- Religion: Zoroastrianism

Kavad II (Middle Persian: 𐭪𐭥𐭠𐭲, romanized: Kawād) was the Sasanian King of Kings (shahanshah) of Iran briefly in 628.

Born Sheroe, he was the son of Khosrow II (r. 590–628) and Maria, and with the help of different factions of the nobility, Sheroe overthrew his father in 628. At this time, the Iranian army had been split into three separate armies, each led by one of the faction leaders. After ascending the throne, he had his father and all his brothers executed. He made peace with the Byzantine emperor Heraclius (r. 610–641), thus bringing to an end the Byzantine–Sasanian War of 602–628.

Kavad II soon died of a devastating plague, which became known as the Plague of Sheroe. He was succeeded by his seven-year-old son Ardashir III (r. 628–630).

Contemporary sources and modern historians have a mixed view of Kavad II, with some of the latter criticizing him for his fratricide, considering the severe consequences it had on the empire. The Austrian historian and numismatist Nikolaus Schindel on the contrary suggests that Kavad II's fratricide may have prevented a possible civil war, and had Kavad II lived longer, he may have been able to prevent the disintegration of the Sasanian state and the following Arab-Islamic conquest of Iran.

== Background ==
Born Sheroe, (Note: Also spelled Shiroe, Seiroe, Shiruya, Shiruyah and Shiruyih.) he was the son of Khosrow II (r. 590–628), the last prominent Sasanian King of Kings (shahanshah) of Iran. His mother was Maria, a Byzantine woman whom some Eastern sources considered to be a daughter of the emperor Maurice (r. 582–602). However, Byzantine sources do not report that Maurice had a daughter named Maria, much less that he gave her in marriage to a member of the Sasanian dynasty. According to the Austrian historian and numismatist Nikolaus Schindel, Maria most likely belonged to the aristocracy of the Sasanian Empire. The union of Khosrow and Maria took place in 590 at the earliest, making Sheroe 37 years old at maximum when he became king in 628. It is certain Sheroe had at least reached adulthood by then, as he had a seven-year-old son (Ardashir III) when he died in the same year. According to the 7th-century Greek Christian chronicle Chronicon Paschale, Sheroe was Khosrow II's eldest son. However, this remains uncertain. (Note: On the contrary, the medieval Muslim historian al-Tabari reported that Shahriyar was Khosrow II's eldest son.)

== Early life ==
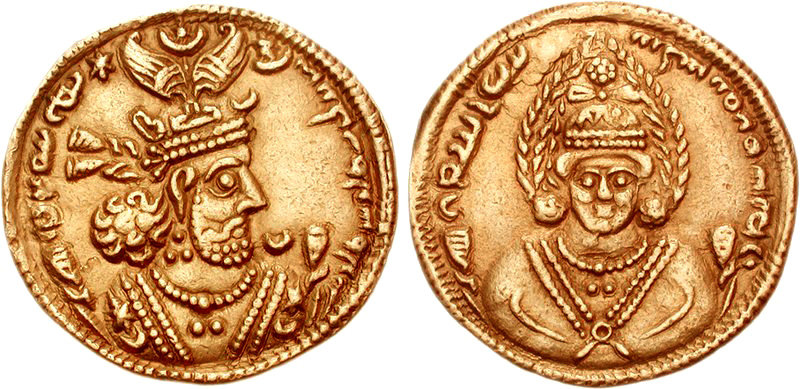
Gold dinar of Khosrow II (r. 590–628)

In 602, Maurice was murdered by his political rival Phocas. As a result, Khosrow II proceeded to declare war, ostensibly to avenge the death of Maurice. During the two-decade war, Khosrow II was initially successful, conquering the Byzantine provinces in the Near East, including Egypt. However, by 627 the tables had turned against the Sasanians, with the Byzantine emperor Heraclius (r. 610–641) seizing chunks of Adurbadagan (in present-day northwestern Iran) and laying waste to the temple of Adur Gushnasp. The nobles had grown weary of Khosrow II's policies, with some of them possibly already starting to form an opposition against him following the failed siege of Constantinople in 626. During this period, Sheroe was imprisoned in a fortress outside of Babylon together with a couple of unidentified brothers. There they were educated by tutors sent by Khosrow II.

Following the Byzantine sacking of the royal Sasanian residence at Dastagird on 6 January 628, Khosrow II fled to the Sasanian capital of Ctesiphon. There he tried to secure the city and his legacy. He planned to crown his son Mardanshah (whose mother was the Christian queen Shirin) as his heir apparent. When Sheroe was informed of this, he immediately sent his foster brother to Gurdanasp, a former general who led the opposition against Khosrow II. Gurdanasp declined to have an audience with Sheroe, instead asking him to send a letter to express himself. Sheroe soon sent a letter, in which he promised to replace Khosrow II as the shahanshah, make peace with the Byzantines and the Western Turkic Khaganate, and increase the rank of the conspirators and the income of the army. Having convinced the conspirators with his letter, Sheroe continued to correspond with them through his foster brother, who made it possible for the two parties to plan their actions for the upcoming coup d'état.

== The coup against Khosrow II ==
=== Preparations ===
Map of the metropolis of Ctesiphon

It was essential for the conspirators to move quickly to catch Khosrow II and his men off guard. To maintain contact between Ctesiphon and Veh-Ardashir, it was necessary to occupy the pontoon bridge over the Tigris River. The core of individuals involved in the conspiracy had to grow as quickly as feasible. To gather more support, they had to make the political equivalent of a shock attack. The conspirators agreed to stage the coup on the night of 23/24 February. They made the decision to inform Heraclius of the situation by sending a group of deputies to him. They required assurance that the Byzantines would be prepared to talk peace terms with a newly established Iranian government. They must have felt encouraged by Heraclius' recent proposition to Khosrow II, but they required a clear promise from him. Much justification for the coup attempt would be gone if there was no assurance that the Byzantines would also favor making peace, as the Sasanian state would get weakened by the coup.

Four army commanders and two high-ranking civilians made up the deputation that departed. The hazarbed Gousdanaspa Razei was in charge of it. Once Heraclius had given the desired assurance, Gousdanaspa Razei was permitted to tell him about the details of the scheme, the upcoming coup, and its date. The deputation needed about a week's worth of time because the Byzantine army was about 200 kilometers from Ctesiphon. They thus must have departed by 17 February to be in time for the coup on 23/24 February. They met with Heraclius in Shahrazur, most likely around 19 February. There they received his assurance, and in return informed him of the details of the coup.

=== The coup ===
At night, a group of distinguished state officials brought Sheroe into Veh-Ardashir. Along with removing the horses from the royal stables and transporting them over the river, the conspirators from Ctesiphon crossed the bridge to meet him. A messenger called attention to Sheroe's takeover of authority and called for people to join his cause. The prisoners were freed, being told that the new shahanshah had opened the "gates of life" for them. They stole the horses from the royal stables and rode on them around while displaying their chains and berating Khosrow II. Instead of lending the coup military power, their main role was to intensify the revolutionary climate through their yelling and galloping. Heraclius had previously suggested that the conspirators free and arm the Byzantine prisoners of war, though there is no proof that they followed his advice.

The palace guards were made aware of the situation by the ruckus coming from Veh-Ardashir, and several of them crossed the bridge to join the rebels. Khosrow II inquired about the commotion and trumpet noise. He tried to flee after learning the truth from his attendants but discovered that the royal stables were empty. The last of the guards fled as the rebels crossed the river around daybreak and moved toward the palace. Khosrow II disguised himself and went to the palace's gardens, where he hid. A search crew discovered him there; he was then apprehended, cuffed, and imprisoned in the new treasury building. The following day, on 25 February, Sheroe ascended the throne, adopting "Kavad" as his regal name.

== Reign ==
=== Execution of his father and brothers ===
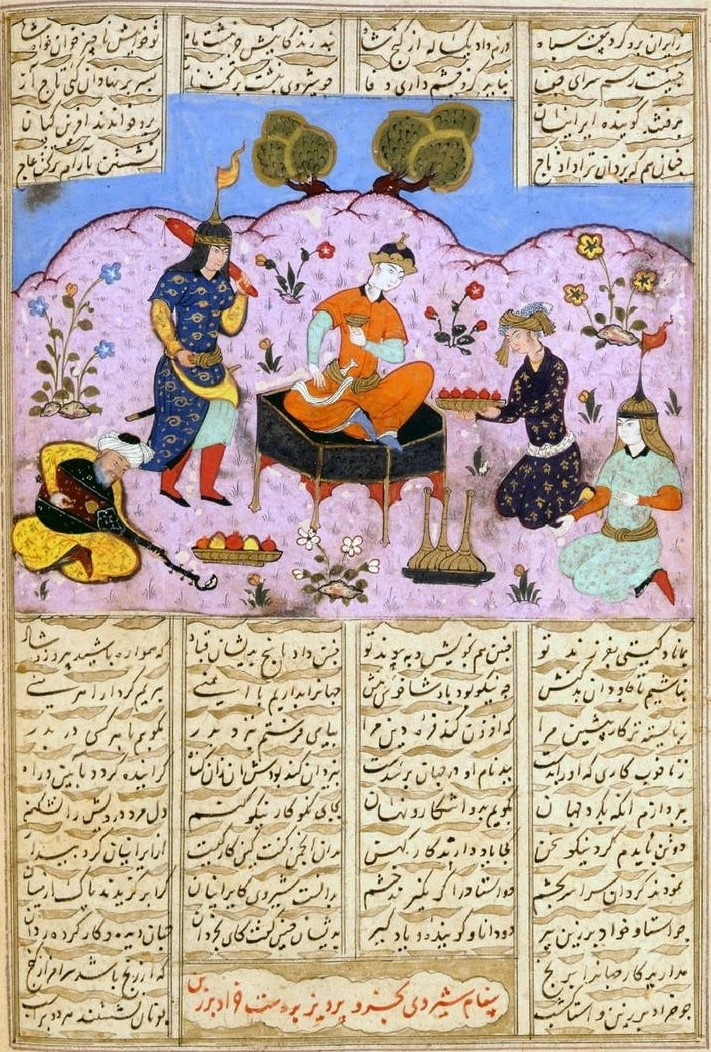
Folio from the Shahnameh depicting the enthronement of Kavad II. Created in 1518 in Tabriz, Safavid Iran

The conspirators that overthrew Khosrow II and installed Kavad II on the throne were composed of several powerful dynastic factions; the Nemrozi faction led by Mihr Hormozd; Shahrbaraz, who represented a branch of the Mihran family; the House of Ispahbudhan represented by Farrukh Hormizd and his two sons Rostam Farrokhzad and Farrukhzad; the Armenian faction represented by Varaztirots II Bagratuni; and the Kanarangiyan. At this juncture, the Iranian army had been split into three separate armies; the army of Adurbadagan led by Farrukh Hormizd; the occupation army of Shahrbaraz; and the army of Nemroz, led by Mihr Hormozd.

Right after Kavad II's accession, the grandees pressured him to have Khosrow II executed, telling him that "It is not fitting that we should have two kings: either you kill Khosrow, and we will be your faithful and obedient servants, or we shall depose you and give our obedience to him [Khosrow] just as we always did before you secured the royal power." Kavad II, terrified and devastated, dispatched Asfadjushnas as a deputy to Khosrow II. Asfadjushnas' task was to explain to Khosrow II all the crimes he had committed, and the reasons for his removal and eventual execution. The lengthy discussion between the two is recounted by al-Tabari. Agitated, Kavad II ordered his father to be executed. Although various figures wanted vengeance upon Khosrow II, no one dared to commit regicide. Mihr Hormozd eventually volunteered. He was the son of Mardanshah, the former padgospan of Nemroz, who had at his own request been executed by Khosrow II, due to being mutilated and dishonored by the latter. Khosrow II was executed on 28 February 628.

It was also either during this period or later, that Kavad II had all his brothers (17 or 18 of them) executed. (Note: The 9th-century historian Dinawari mentioned a son of Khosrow II and Gordiya, named Juvansher, as later ruling as shahanshah. If true, it would mean that Juvansher managed to avoid Kavad II's slaughter of his brothers. This king remains obscure, and none of his coins have yet been found.) This was done at the instigation of his minister Piruz Khosrow and Shamta, the son of Khosrow II's treasurer Yazdin. Al-Tabari describes the executed brothers as "men of good education, bravery, and the manly virtues". He adds that Kavad II was scolded by his sisters Boran and Azarmidokht for his actions, which caused him to become remorseful.

=== Peace negotiations with the Byzantine Empire ===
Following his accession, Kavad II sent two groups of deputies to inform Heraclius of his victory. The first group was composed of a Persian and an Armenian, sent in advance to make preparations for the safe passage of the other group, led by Chosdaï, a high-rank royal secretary. The first group met with Heraclius on 24 March, where they gave him a letter from Chosdaï, which said that the latter was on his way with a group of delegates from the government and would be bringing written suggestions from the new shahanshah. On 3 April, Heraclius met with Chosdaï, who gave him a letter from Kavad II as well as lavish gifts. There Chosdaï provided thoroughly thought-out peace offers. After consolidating his position, Kavad II had turned to the Sasanian Empire's most influential constituency—the noble estate—for formal permission to begin peace negotiations with the Byzantines. This was easily gained, as the coup against Khosrow II owed its success to the extensive war-weariness and vehement dissatisfaction at many of the policies implemented in order to prolong the war effort.

It was acknowledged that the majority of Khosrow II's enormous territorial gains would need to be given up. However, it was not what the exact frontier line should look like. Although Byzantium and Iran had been neighbours for a very long time, a precise definition of their geographic boundaries had not been established. Arguments could be made in favor of all of the several frontiers that had separated their lands since the resurgence of Iranian authority in the middle of the 3rd-century, due to the lack of any evident topographical, ethnic, or cultural line of boundary south or north of the Armenian Taurus Mountains.

Map of the Byzantine-Iranian frontier during Late Antiquity before the war of 602–628

The letter sent by Kavad II to Heraclius from this period has partly survived in the Chronicon Paschale. In it, he labels Heraclius as "the most clement Roman emperor, our brother" in contrast to Khosrow II's belittling message towards the latter. By using the word "brother", Kavad II made it clear right away that he acknowledged the Byzantine Empire as legitimate and equals of Iran. He was thus swiftly re-establishing the dualistic world order that had been dominant for four centuries. He announced his ascension to the throne of his fathers and forefathers via the protection of God in the letter's body, which was kept brief. Kavad II was doing everything in his power to avoid supporting the idea that the war had been a religious conflict by omitting mention of the divinities in Zoroastrianism.

He claimed that he intended to free every individual held in jail, including political opponents of his father and prisoners of war, as a sign of his commitment to doing whatever could be helpful and in the service of mankind. The letter did not discuss how to fix the borders. Instead, Chosdaï had to relay the Sasanian offer to withdraw from Byzantine territory verbally, and Heraclius had to respond in writing with precise suggestions on how to fix the borders. A solemn oath, sealed in the customary Persian fashion with salt, was placed within the letter.

Heraclius responded with a letter four days later, which has also partly survived. In the first portion, only the final few words of each line have been preserved. He confirmed receiving the letter brought by Chosdaï, congratulated Kavad II on becoming king (mentioning both God's role and Kavad II's good fate), and wished him many years of success, vigor, and peace. He also recognized Kavad II's stated intention to work in the service of mankind. The rest of Heraclius' letter has not survived.

The English historian James Howard-Johnston suggests that the rest of Heraclius' letter was a general statement, in which he said that he was prepared to make peace, along with some indication of what he thought should be a fair boundary to draw between the two empires. In accordance with the conditions of his earlier offer, Kavad II would then be required to make arrangements for the Iranian soldiers' withdrawal from what was acknowledged to be Byzantine land and the release of all Byzantine prisoners of war. This is all implied in the History of Khosrov, a source that Howard-Johnston considers to be the "only trustworthy account of the second stage of negotiations." The Byzantine writer Nikephoros I claims that in the letter Heraclius called Kavad II his "son," thus declaring superiority over the Sasanian Empire. Howard-Johnston dismisses this claim, amongst other things arguing that due to the weakened Byzantine military, Heraclius was in no position to make such an assertion.

After the negotiations were successful, Kavad II started carrying out the agreement's obligations. He gave orders for a letter to be written, telling Shahrbaraz to assemble his troops and head back to Iranian land, which he refused. According to Howard-Johnston, Shahrbaraz—having conquered the Byzantine Middle East—was not willing to give up more or less everything he had achieved in order to stop more violence and expenditure. However, the Iranologist Parvaneh Pourshariati suggests that Shahrbaraz's noncompliance was due to his concern of the collaboration of the other factions of Iran, who were managing the affairs of the state while he was still in Byzantine territory. Shahrbaraz's refusal led to a deadlock, which would last for months. However, for the time being, Heraclius and his men could march home in peace, assured that the protracted conflict was finished, while the Iranian military could start preparing operations against the Turks in the South Caucasus.

=== Death and succession ===
Kavad II soon died of a devastating plague, which became known as the Plague of Sheroe. According to the 10th-century Arab historian and geographer al-Masudi, at least a third of Iran's population—or perhaps even half—died to the plague. Al-Tabari reported that "most of the Persians perished." According to the modern historian Michael Bonner, epidemic sickness would have quickly swept throughout Mesopotamia's crowded and densely populated communities. He adds that while it is possible the highlands of Iran remained unharmed, sources raise the possibility that the plague's impact on Ctesiphon urban area was as devastating as they claim. It is uncertain around what time Kavad II died, as sources differ on whether he ruled six, seven, or eight months. He died in late summer or early autumn, and was succeeded by his seven-year-old son Ardashir III, who was supervised by Mah-Adhur Gushnasp as his regent.

== Religious policy ==
Kavad II, like all other Sasanian rulers, was an adherent of Zoroastrianism. The government of Kavad II helped Christian churches, such as giving the Church of the East permission to nominate their own catholicos, a privilege they had lost since 609.

== Coinage and imperial ideology ==
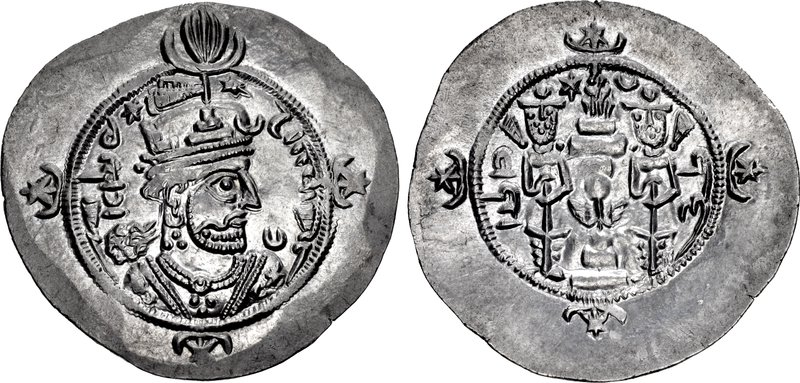
Silver drachma of Kavad II, minted at Ray

The majority of his Khosrow II's design ideas on Sasanian coins were abandoned by Kavad II, including the numerous rims on the obverse and reverse, Verethragna's wings in the crown, the word xwarrah ("royal splendor)" and a star symbol, which had replaced the korymbos. On the obverse of Kavad II's coins, the engraving reads Kawād pērōz ("Kavad the victorious").

Although the previous Sasanian monarch Kavad I (r. 488–496, 498/9–531) was not portrayed positively by the royal propaganda of Kavad II, the latter still chose to adopt his name. Schindel calls this choice "somewhat surprising".

== Family ==
A passage of the Chronicle of Edessa identifies "Anzoy the Roman" as the wife of Kavad II and mother of Ardashir III. She was probably a Christian princess from the Byzantine Empire.

According to Guidi's Chronicle, Boran was also Kavad II's wife, demonstrating the practice in Zoroastrianism of Xwedodah, or close-kin marriage. (Note: According to the 7th-century Armenian historian Sebeos, Boran was the wife of Shahrbaraz. However, according to the modern historians Marie Louise Chaumont and Parvaneh Pourshariati, this is unlikely.)

== Legacy and assessment ==
The personal power of the shahanshah was lower under Kavad II than under Khosrow II. The fact that the shahanshah had stopped leading his army into battle since Hormizd IV (r. 579–590) may have been a significant contributing element. This may have caused a growing disconnection between the army and the shahanshah, which gave military commanders (such as Bahram Chobin and Shahrbaraz) the opportunity to challenge the shahanshah—something which never happened in earlier Sasanian history. Pourshariati considers Kavad II to have had little authority, arguing that the factions who had overthrown Khosrow II were in control of the affairs of the empire.

Some sources such as al-Tabari consider Kavad II to be a bad ruler, while others such as the Chronicle of Seert paint a more favorable picture of him. Schindel suggests that if Kavad II had lived longer, he might had been able to prevent the disintegration of the Sasanian political structure and the impending Arab-Islamic conquest of Iran.

Assessing Kavad II's execution of his brothers, Schindel also states that; "While one cannot defend the slaughter of his brothers from an ethical point of view, it might have seemed preferable to risking a civil war if any of these potential rivals should have made a bid for the throne, especially given the depleted military manpower. At the same time, such a desperate measure was not completely new, since Hormizd IV is also said to have killed his brothers upon his accession." According to Bonner, Kavad II's reign was "disgraced by the massacre of his brothers" and that the "near extermination of the male line of the Sasanian family was to disrupt the royal succession forever, and royal prestige never recovered." Iranologist Touraj Daryaee states that Kavad II's fratricide "would have a devastating effect on the future of the empire."

Kavad II appears under the name "Siroes" in an apocalyptic chronicle, in which he fights Nehemiah over control of Jerusalem. The Jews escape after Siroes kills the progenitor of the Messiah. According to the prophecy, the events would take place in 1058. The modern historian Israel Levi places the author's residence in Palestine and dates the work to 629–636. The Jews of Palestine had great hopes for a Messianic verdict in history when the Sassanids took control of Jerusalem in 614 CE, and thus despised Kavad II for his murder of his father and subsequent peace with Heraclius. Considered the epitome of the anti-messiah, Kavad II was as a result made into a villain in the messianic story.

== Sources ==
- Al-Tabari, Abu Ja'far Muhammad ibn Jarir (1985–2007). Ehsan Yar-Shater (ed.). The History of Al-Ṭabarī. Vol. V. Albany, NY: State University of New York Press. ISBN 978-0-7914-4355-2.
- Bonner, Michael (2020). The Last Empire of Iran. New York: Gorgias Press. ISBN 978-1463206161.
- Chaumont, Marie Louise (1989). "Bōrān". In Yarshater, Ehsan (ed.). Encyclopædia Iranica. Vol. IV/4: Bolbol I–Brick. London and New York: Routledge & Kegan Paul. p. 366. ISBN 978-0-71009-127-7.
- Daryaee, Touraj (1999). "The Coinage of Queen Bōrān and Its Significance for Late Sāsānian Imperial Ideology". Bulletin (British Society for Middle Eastern Studies). 13: 77–82. JSTOR 24048959. (registration required)
- Daryaee, Touraj (2014). Sasanian Persia: The Rise and Fall of an Empire. I.B.Tauris. ISBN 978-0-85771-666-8.
- Daryaee, Touraj; Rezakhani, Khodadad (2017). "The Sasanian Empire". In Daryaee, Touraj (ed.). King of the Seven Climes: A History of the Ancient Iranian World (3000 BCE – 651 CE). UCI Jordan Center for Persian Studies. ISBN 978-0692864401.
- Howard-Johnston, James (2000). "Ḵosrow II". In Yarshater, Ehsan (ed.). Encyclopædia Iranica (Online ed.). Encyclopædia Iranica Foundation.
- Howard-Johnston, James (2020). The Last Great War of Antiquity. Oxford University Press. ISBN 978-0198830191.
- Martindale, John R.; Jones, A.H.M.; Morris, John (1992), The Prosopography of the Later Roman Empire, Volume III: AD 527–641, Cambridge University Press, ISBN 0-521-20160-8
- Neusner, Jacob (1970). A History of the Jews in Babylonia, Part 5. Later Sasanian Times. Brill. ISBN 978-90-04-50893-4.
- Payne, Richard E. (2015). A State of Mixture: Christians, Zoroastrians, and Iranian Political Culture in Late Antiquity. Univ of California Press. ISBN 978-0-520-29245-1.
- Pourshariati, Parvaneh (2008). Decline and Fall of the Sasanian Empire: The Sasanian-Parthian Confederacy and the Arab Conquest of Iran. London and New York: I.B. Tauris. ISBN 978-1-84511-645-3.
- Schindel, Nikolaus (2013). "Sasanian Coinage". In Potts, Daniel T. (ed.). The Oxford Handbook of Ancient Iran. Oxford University Press. ISBN 978-0199733309.
- Schindel, Nikolaus (2022). "Kawād II". In Daniel, Elton (ed.). Encyclopaedia Iranica Online. Leiden: Brill. doi:10.1163/2330-4804_EIRO_COM_366417. ISSN 2330-4804.
- Zeini, Arash (2018). "Qobad II". In Nicholson, Oliver (ed.). The Oxford Dictionary of Late Antiquity. Oxford: Oxford University Press. ISBN 978-0-19-866277-8.

Kavad II Sasanian dynasty Born: after 590 Died: Summer/Autumn 628
Preceded by Khosrow II	King of Kings of Iran and non-Iran; 25 February 628 – Summer/Autumn 628	Succeeded by Ardashir III
