= Piruz Khosrow =

Sasanian military officer (d. 642)

Piruz Khosrow (Middle Persian: Pērōz Khusraw), also known as Piruzan or Firuzan, was a powerful Persian aristocrat who was the leader of the Parsig (Persian) faction that controlled much of the affairs of the Sasanian Empire during the Sasanian civil war of 628-632. He was killed at the Battle of Nahāvand in 642.

== Biography ==
=== Sasanian civil war ===
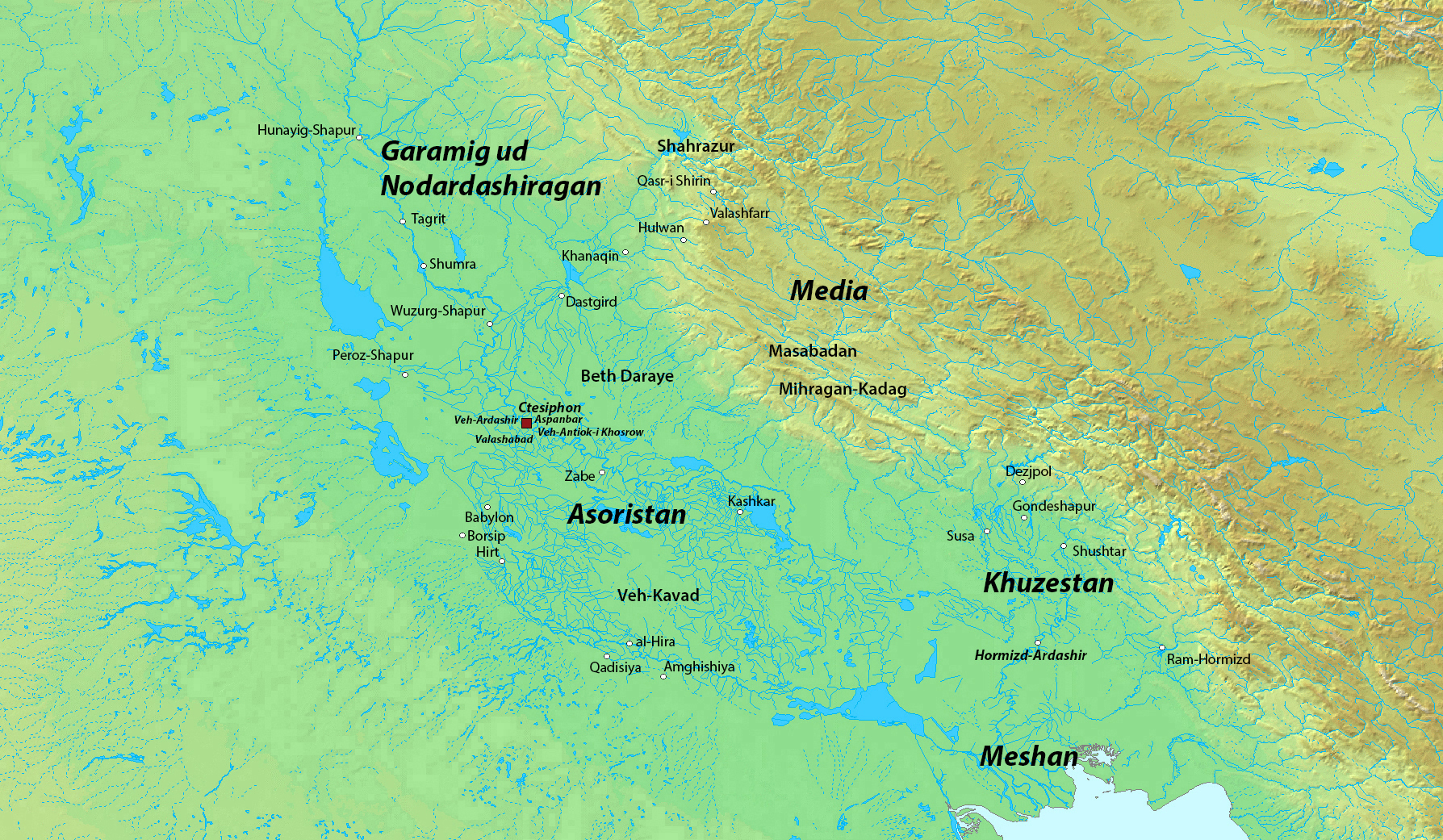
Map of Sasanian Mesopotamia and its surroundings.

Piruz is first mentioned in 628, as one of the conspirators against Khosrow II. During this period Piruz assumed the leadership of the Parsig faction, while the Ispahbudhan Farrukh Hormizd, assumed the leadership of the Pahlav (Parthian) faction. After the overthrow of Khosrow, the latter's son Kavadh II became the new king of the Sasanian Empire. Piruz was then elected as his wuzurg framadār (vizier or prime minister); reportedly, under Kavadh's orders, he executed all of Kavadh's brothers and half-brothers. Kavadh then made peace with the Byzantine Empire, which restored all their lost territories.

However, shortly after these events, the Parsig and Pahlav faction came into conflict, which divided the resources of the country. Soon, a devastating plague spread over western Iran, which killed half of the population along with Kavadh II, who was succeeded by Ardashir III. Piruz was then succeeded by Mah-Adhur Gushnasp as the wuzurg framadār of the empire, while Piruz remained as the commander of the royal guard (hazarbed).

One year later, Shahrbaraz, with a force of 6,000 men, marched towards Ctesiphon and besieged the city. Shahrbaraz, however, was unable to capture the city, and then made an alliance with Piruz. He also made an alliance with Namdar Jushnas, the spahbed of Nimruz. Shahrbaraz, with the aid of these two powerful figures, captured Ctesiphon, and executed Ardashir III, along with his minister Mah-Adhur Gushnasp, including other Sasanian nobles like Ardabīl. Forty days later, Shahrbaraz was murdered by Farrukh Hormizd, who then made Borandukht, the daughter of Khosrow II, ascend the throne.

Borandukht, was, however, deposed by Shapur-i Shahrvaraz, the son of Khosrow II's sister Mirhran and Shahrbaraz. He was shortly deposed by Piruz and his faction, who did not acknowledge his rule. He crowned Azarmidokht, the sister of Borandukht, as monarch of Persia. In order to make a union with the Parsig faction, and to seize power, Farrukh Hormizd asked Azarmidokht to marry him. Not daring to refuse, Azarmidokht had him killed with the aid of the Mihranid Siyavakhsh, who was the grandson of Bahram Chobin, the famous spahbed and briefly shahanshah.

She was, however, shortly killed by the latter's son Rostam Farrokhzad, who then restored Borandukht to the throne, who later made a meeting with the Pahlav and Parsig faction, where both factions agreed to work together. Piruz, however, later strangled Borandukht himself, which ended the Parsig-Pahlav alliance and resumed their hostilities. Rostam and Piruz, were, however, threatened by their own men, who, according to al-Tabari, told the two faction leaders that: "the two of you have not reached such a rank that Iran will concur with you in this opinion and that you expose it to perdition. After Baghdad, Valashabad, and Tikrit, there is only Ctesiphon. By God, either the two of you unite, or else we will indeed begin with you." Piruz and Rostam then agreed to work together once again, and crowned Yazdegerd III, the grandson of Khosrow II, as the new king of the empire.

=== Arab invasion ===
One year later, the Muslim Arabs began conquering Persia. Bahman Jadhuyih, a member of the Parsig faction, along with Andarzaghar, clashed with the Arabs at the battle of Walaja; they were, however, defeated. In 634, after several Sasanian defeats, Bahman managed to defeat the Arabs at the battle of the bridge. Two years later, the Arabs made a counter-attack and defeated the Sasanians at the battle of al-Qādisiyyah, where Piruz would command the rear guard of the Sasanian army. After their defeat, many notable Iranian figures including Rostam Farrokhzad and Bahman Jadhuyih, were killed. The Arabs then besieged Ctesiphon. Piruz managed to survive and along with Nakhiragan, Mihran Razi and Hormuzan, including the rest of the survivors, regrouped at Bavel (Babylon), where they tried to repel the Arab army, but were once again defeated.

Ctesiphon was shortly captured, and Piruz fled to Jalula, where he began raising another army. He later clashed with the Arabs at the battle of Jalula in 637, where he was once again defeated, while Mihran Razi was killed. Piruz then fled to Media, where he regrouped with the Sasanian nobles, and fought the Arabs at the battle of Nahavand in 642, where he was at last killed.

== Sources ==
- Pourshariati, Parvaneh (2008). Decline and Fall of the Sasanian Empire: The Sasanian-Parthian Confederacy and the Arab Conquest of Iran. London and New York: I.B. Tauris. ISBN 978-1-84511-645-3.
- Shapur Shahbazi, A. (1986). "ARDAŠĪR III". Encyclopaedia Iranica, Online Edition.
- Shapur Shahbazi, A. (2005). "SASANIAN DYNASTY". Encyclopaedia Iranica, Online Edition.
- Morony, Michael G. (2005) [1984]. Iraq After The Muslim Conquest. Gorgias Press LLC. ISBN 978-1-59333-315-7.
- Zarrinkub, Abd al-Husain (1975). "The Arab conquest of Iran and its aftermath". The Cambridge History of Iran, Volume 4: From the Arab Invasion to the Saljuqs. Cambridge: Cambridge University Press. pp. 1–57. ISBN 978-0-521-20093-6.

| Unknown | Wuzurg framadār of the Sasanian Empire; 25 February 628 – 6 September 628 | Succeeded by Mah-Adhur Gushnasp |
| Preceded by Aspad Gushnasp | Hazarbed of the royal Sasanian guard 6 September 628 – 642 (?) | Unknown |
