= Farrukh Hormizd =

- King of Kings of Iranians and non-Iranians
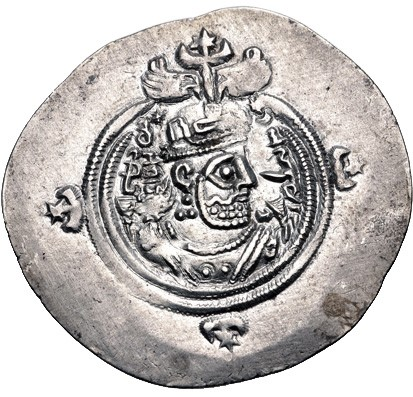

Shahanshah of the Sasanian Empire
- Reign: 630–631
- Predecessor: Azarmidokht
- Successor: Azarmidokht
- Died: 631; Ctesiphon
- Issue: Rostam Farrokhzad; Farrukhzad
- House: House of Ispahbudhan
- Father: Vinduyih
- Religion: Zoroastrianism

Farrukh Hormizd or Farrokh Hormizd (Persian: فرخ‌هرمز), also known as Hormizd V, was an Iranian prince, who was one of the leading figures in Sasanian Iran in the early 7th century. He served as the military commander (spahbed) of northern Iran. He later came in conflict with the Iranian nobility, "dividing the resources of the country". He was later killed by Siyavakhsh in a palace plot on the orders of Azarmidokht after he proposed to her in an attempt to usurp the Sasanian throne. He had two children, Rostam Farrokhzad and Farrukhzad.

== Background ==
Farrukh Hormizd was a member of the Ispahbudhan family, one of the seven Parthian clans. He was the son of Vinduyih, a descendant of Bawi, whose sister was the wife of Kavadh I and mother of Khosrau I. Farrukh's father and uncle, Vistahm, played an important role in defeating the Mihranid Bahram Chobin and restoring Khosrau II to the throne. Khosrau, however, had Vinduyih executed, which made Vistahm revolt against him. The rebellion of Vistahm lasted from 590/1–596 or 594/5–600, until he was betrayed by one of his own generals. After the death of Vistahm, Farrukh succeeded him as the spahbed of the north.

== Career ==
During the late Byzantine–Sasanian War of 602–628, Farrukh Hormizd, and his son Rostam Farrokhzad, rebelled against Khosrau II, allowing the Byzantine emperor Heraclius to invade Atropatene, where he sacked several cities, including the Adur Gushnasp temple.

In 628, the feudal families of Iran secretly mutinied against Khosrau and joined Shahrbaraz. Kavadh was then released by the feudal families of the Sasanian Empire, which included: the House of Ispahbudhan represented by Farrukh Hormizd himself, and his two sons Rostam Farrokhzad, and Farrukhzad; Shahrbaraz, who represented the Mihran family; the Armenian faction represented by Varaztirots II Bagratuni; and finally the Kanarang.

On 25 February, Sheroe, along with his commander Aspad Gushnasp, captured Ctesiphon and imprisoned Khosrow II. He then proclaimed himself as shah of the Sasanian Empire and assumed the dynastic name of Kavad II. He proceeded to have all his brothers and half-brothers executed, including the heir Mardanshah, who was Khosrow's favourite son. The murder of all his brothers, "all well-educated, valiant, and chivalrous men", stripped the Sasanian dynasty of a future competent ruler, and has been described as a "mad rampage" and "reckless". Three days later he ordered Mihr Hormozd to execute his father. However, after the regicide of his father, Kavad also proceeded to have Mihr Hormozd killed. With the agreement of the Iranian nobles, he then made peace with the victorious emperor Heraclius, which allowed the Byzantines to (re)gain all their lost territories, their captured soldiers, a war indemnity, along with the True Cross and other relics that were lost in Jerusalem in 614.

The fall of Khosrow II culminated in a civil war lasting four years, with the most powerful members of the nobility gaining full autonomy and starting to create their own government. The hostilities between the Persian (Parsig) and Parthian (Pahlav) noble-families were also resumed, which split up the wealth of the nation. A few months later, a devastating plague swept through the western Sasanian provinces, killing half of its population including Kavad II. He was succeeded by his eight-year-old son Ardashir III, who was killed two years later by the distinguished Iranian general Shahrbaraz, who was in turn murdered forty days later in a coup by Farrukh Hormizd, who helped Boran ascend the throne.

When Boran ascended the throne, she appointed Farrukh Hormizd as the chief minister (wuzurg framadar) of the empire. She then attempted to bring stability to Iran by the implementation of justice, reconstruction of the infrastructure, lowering of taxes, and minting coins. Her rule was accepted by the nobility and clergy, which is apparent by her coin mints in the provinces of Pars, Khuzestan, Media, and Abarshahr. No opposition was voiced towards her gender. However, after some time she was deposed in 630, and Shapur-i Shahrvaraz, the son of Shahrbaraz and a sister of Khosrow II, was made shah of Iran. However, he was not recognized by the Parsig faction of the powerful general Piruz Khosrow. Shapur-i Shahrvaraz was thus deposed in favor of Azarmidokht, the sister of Boran.

== Usurpation and death ==
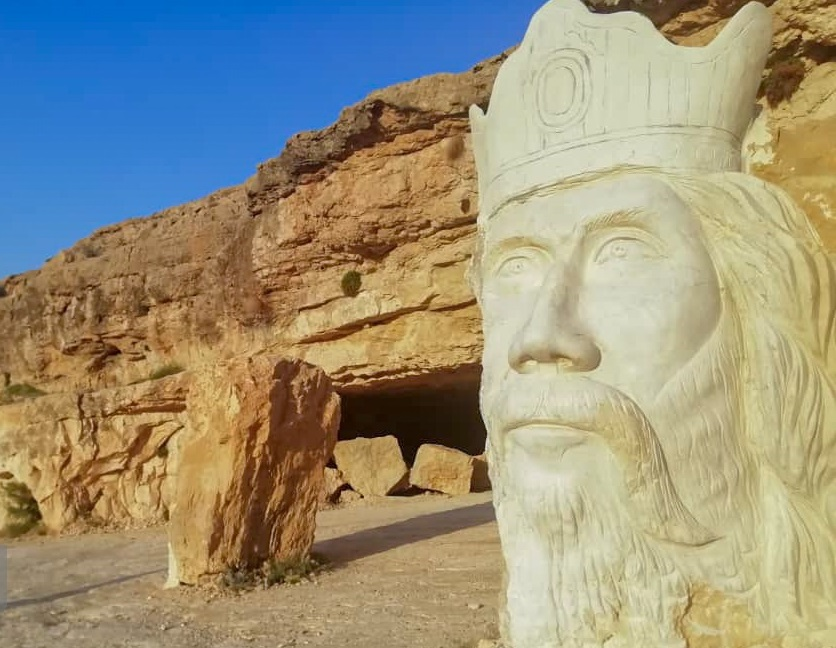
Farrukh Hormizd's bust in Jahrom Sangtarashan cave. According to Shahnameh, he was living in Jahrom, before leaving the city for Ctesiphon.

Farrukh Hormizd, in order to strengthen his authority and create a modus vivendi between the Pahlav and Parsig, asked Azarmidokht (who was a Parsig nominee) to marry him. Azarmidokht, however, declined. After having his proposal declined, Farrukh Hormizd "no longer shied away from the throne itself", declaring "Today I am the leader of the people and the pillar of the country of Iran." He started minting coins in the same fashion as a monarch, notably in Istakhr in Pars and Nahavand in Media. In order to deal with Farrukh Hormizd, Azarmidokht supposedly allied herself with Mihranid dynast Siyavakhsh, who was the grandson of Bahram Chobin, the famous military commander (spahbed) and briefly shah of Iran. With Siyavakhsh's aid, Azarmidokht had Farrukh Hormizd killed.

Rostam Farrokhzad, who was at that time stationed in Khorasan, succeeded him as the leader of the Pahlav. In order to avenge his father, he left for Ctesiphon, "defeating every army of Azarmidokht that he met". He then defeated Siyavakhsh's forces at Ctesiphon and captured the city. Azarmidokht was shortly afterwards blinded and killed by Rostam, who restored Boran to the throne.

== Family tree ==
Legend
Orange	King of Kings	Yellow	King

Bawi
Shapur
Vinduyih	Vistahm
Farrukh Hormizd	Tiruyih	Vinduyih
Rostam Farrokhzad	Farrukhzad
Shahram	Surkhab I	Isfandyadh	Bahram	Farrukhan

== Sources ==
- Schmitt, Rüdiger (2005a). "Personal Names, Iranian iv. Sasanian Period". Encyclopaedia Iranica.
- Schmitt, Rüdiger (2005b). "Personal Names, Iranian iv. Parthian Period". Encyclopaedia Iranica.
- Pourshariati, Parvaneh (2008). Decline and Fall of the Sasanian Empire: The Sasanian-Parthian Confederacy and the Arab Conquest of Iran. London and New York: I.B. Tauris. ISBN 978-1-84511-645-3.
- Daryaee, Touraj (2014). Sasanian Persia: The Rise and Fall of an Empire. I.B.Tauris. pp. 1–240. ISBN 978-0857716668.
- Daryaee, Touraj (2009). "Shapur II". Encyclopaedia Iranica.
- Kia, Mehrdad (2016). The Persian Empire: A Historical Encyclopedia [2 volumes]: A Historical Encyclopedia. ABC-CLIO. ISBN 978-1610693912.
- Chaumont, Marie Louise (1989). "Bōrān". Encyclopaedia Iranica, Vol. IV, Fasc. 4. p. 366.
- Sundermann, W. (1988). "Bānbišn". Encyclopaedia Iranica, Vol. III, Fasc. 7. London et al. pp. 678–679.
- Brosius, Maria. "WOMEN i. In Pre-Islamic Persia". Encyclopaedia Iranica, Vol. London et al.
- Al-Tabari, Abu Ja'far Muhammad ibn Jarir (1985–2007). Ehsan Yar-Shater (ed.). The History of Al-Ṭabarī. Vol. 40 vols. Albany, NY: State University of New York Press.
- Shahbazi, A. Shapur (2005). "Sasanian dynasty". Encyclopaedia Iranica, Online Edition.
- Daryaee, Touraj (1999). "The Coinage of Queen Bōrān and Its Significance for Late Sāsānian Imperial Ideology". Bulletin (British Society for Middle Eastern Studies). 13: 77–82. JSTOR 24048959.
- Emrani, Haleh (2009). Like Father, Like Daughter: Late Sasanian Imperial Ideology & the Rise of Bōrān to Power (PDF). Sasanika. pp. 1–16. Archived from the original (PDF) on 2015-08-15.
- Howard-Johnston, James (2010). "Ḵosrow II". Encyclopaedia Iranica, Online Edition.
- Gignoux, Ph. (1987). "Āzarmīgduxt". Encyclopaedia Iranica, Vol. III, Fasc. 2. p. 190.
- Oman, Charles (1893). Europe, 476–918. Macmillan.

Farrukh Hormizd House of Ispahbudhan
Preceded by Azarmidokht	King of Kings of Iran and non-Iran; 630–631	Succeeded by Azarmidokht
