= Mardanshah =

- Died: 642; Nahavand, Iran
- Military career
- Allegiance: Sassanid Empire
- Branch: Sassanid army
- Conflicts: Battle of Nahavand

Mardanshah (Persian: مردانشاه) was a Sassanian Persian general, the Arabs referred him to as Dhul Hājib (Arabic: ذو الحاجب, the "owner of bushy eyebrows") as was Bahman Jadhuyih.

== See also ==
- Battle of Muzayyah
- Battle of the Bridge
- Islamic conquest of Iran
- Muslim conquests
- Sassanid Empire
