= Ardashir III =

Shah of the Sasanian Empire from 628 to 630

Ardashir III 𐭠𐭥𐭲𐭧𐭱𐭲𐭥
- King of Kings of Iranians and non-Iranians
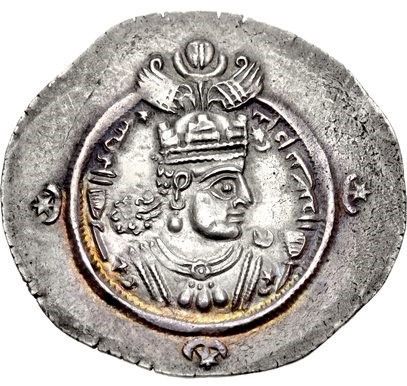
- Drachma of Ardashir III, minted at Arrajan in 629.

Shahanshah of the Sasanian Empire
- Reign: 6 September 628 – 27 April 630
- Predecessor: Kavad II
- Successor: Shahrbaraz
- Born: 621
- Died: 27 April 630 (aged 9); Ctesiphon
- Burial: Meshan
- House: House of Sasan
- Father: Kavad II
- Mother: Anzoy
- Religion: Zoroastrianism

Ardashir III (Middle Persian: 𐭠𐭥𐭲𐭧𐭱𐭲𐭥, romanized: Ardašir; 621 – 27 April 630) was the Sasanian King of Kings (shahanshah) of Iran from 6 September 628 to 27 April 630.

== Name ==
Ardashir is the Middle Persian form of the Old Persian Ṛtaxšira (also spelled Artaxšaçā, meaning "whose reign is through truth"). The Latin variant of the name is Artaxerxes. Three kings of the Achaemenid Empire were known to have the same name. He is also recorded in Greek as Adeser (Greek: Αδεσήρ; Theophanes the Confessor) and Artaxes (Greek: Αρτάξης; Chronographeion Syntomon)

== Background ==
Ardashir was the son of king Kavad II (r. 628) and Anzoy, who was a princess from the Byzantine Empire, which made Ardashir less popular among the Iranians, who had recently been in a long and devastating war against the Byzantines. In 628, a devastating plague spread through western Iran, which claimed the lives of half of the population, including Kavad II himself.

== Reign ==
After the death of Kavad II, the Wuzurgan elected Ardashir as his successor, who was only a 7-year-old boy. In reality, however, he exercised little power and his empire was controlled by his vizier Mah-Adhur Gushnasp, whose duty was to protect the empire until Ardashir became old enough to rule. The Iranian historian al-Tabari says the following thing about Mah-Adhur Gushnasp's administration of the Empire; "Mah-Adhur Gushnasp carried on the administration of the kingdom in [such] an excellent fashion, [and with such] firm conduct, [that] no one would have been aware of Ardashir III's youthfulness."

During the same period, a brother of Mah-Adhur Gushnasp named Narsi was granted Kashkar as a part of his domains. However, even under a strong vizier, things were still looking grim in Iran; Factionalism had greatly increased among the Iranians, and several powerful factions which had emerged during the reign of Ardashir's grandfather Khosrau II, had gained firm control of important parts of Iran, while the Sasanian state was less centralized than it had been under Ardashir's predecessors. Ardashir's ascension was supported by both the Pahlav (Parthian) and Parsig (Persian) faction, and a third major faction named the Nimruzi. However, sometime in 629, the Nimruzi withdrew their support for the shah, and started to conspire with the distinguished Iranian general Shahrbaraz to overthrow him. The Pahlav, under their leader Farrukh Hormizd of the Ispahbudhan clan, responded by supporting Ardashir's aunt Boran as the new ruler of Iran, who subsequently started minting coins in the Pahlav areas of Amol, Nishapur, Gurgan and Ray.

One year later, Shahrbaraz with a force of 6,000 men marched towards Ctesiphon and besieged the city. Shahrbaraz, however, was unable to capture the city, and then made an alliance with Piruz Khosrow, the leader of the Parsig, and the previous minister of the Empire during the reign of Ardashir's father. With the support of both the Parsig and Nimruzi, Shahrbaraz captured Ctesiphon and executed Ardashir, Mah-Adhur Gushnasp himself, and many other prominent nobles. Shahrbaraz then ascended the Iranian throne. According to late folklore, Ardashir was buried at an unknown place in Meshan.

== Coinage ==
Like his father, Ardashir III refrained from using the title of shahanshah ("King of Kings") on his coin engravings. This was probably done in order to distance themselves from Khosrow II, who had restored the title.

== Sources ==
- Morony, Michael G. (2005) [1984]. Iraq After The Muslim Conquest. Gorgias Press LLC. ISBN 978-1-59333-315-7.
- Martindale, John R., ed. (1992). The Prosopography of the Later Roman Empire: Volume III, AD 527–641. Cambridge: Cambridge University Press. ISBN 0-521-20160-8.
- Pourshariati, Parvaneh (2008). Decline and Fall of the Sasanian Empire: The Sasanian-Parthian Confederacy and the Arab Conquest of Iran. London and New York: I.B. Tauris. ISBN 978-1-84511-645-3.
- Schmitt, R. (1986). "Artaxerxes". Encyclopaedia Iranica, Vol. II, Fasc. 6. pp. 654–655.
- Schindel, Nikolaus (2013). "Sasanian Coinage". In Potts, Daniel T. (ed.). The Oxford Handbook of Ancient Iran. Oxford University Press. ISBN 978-0199733309.
- Shahbazi, A. Shapur (2005). "Sasanian Dynasty". Encyclopaedia Iranica, Online Edition.
- Shahbazi, A. Shapur (1986). "ARDAŠĪR III". Encyclopaedia Iranica, Vol. II, Fasc. 4. pp. 381–382.
- Wiesehöfer, Joseph (1986). "Ardašīr I i. History". Encyclopaedia Iranica, Vol. II, Fasc. 4. pp. 371–376.

Ardashir III Sasanian dynasty Born: 621 Died: 27 April 630
Preceded by Kavad II	King of kings of Iran and Aniran; 6 September 628–27 April 630	Succeeded by Shahrbaraz
