= Touraj Daryaee =

Iranian Iranologist and historian (born 1967)

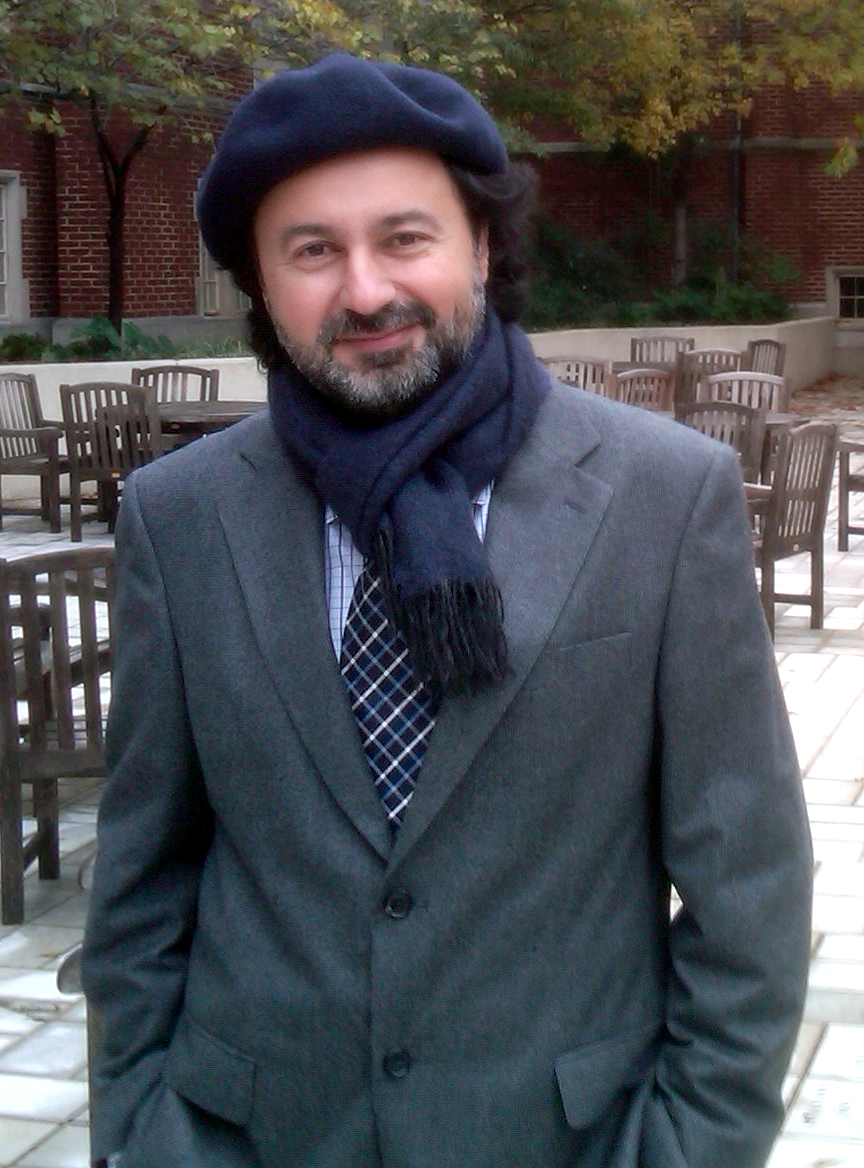
- Daryaee in 2011
- Born: July 20, 1967 (age 59); Tehran, Iran

Academic background
- Education: University of California, Los Angeles
- Thesis: The Fall of the Sāsānian Empire and the End of Late Antiquity: Continuity and Change in the Province of Persis (1999)

Academic work
- Discipline: Iranology
- Institutions: University of California, Irvine; École pratique des hautes études California State University, Fullerton
- Main interests: Ancient/Medieval Iranian History; Iranian languages and literature Zoroastrianism; Numismatics

Touraj Daryaee (Persian: تورج دریایی [tʰuːˌɾæd͡ʒɛ dæɾjɒːˈ(j)iː]; 20 July 1967) is an Iranian Iranologist and historian. He currently works as the Maseeh Chair in Persian Studies and Culture and the director of the Dr. Samuel M. Jordan Center for Persian Studies at the University of California, Irvine.

== Career ==
Daryaee completed his elementary and secondary schooling in Tehran, Iran and Athens, Greece. He then completed a PhD in history at the University of California, Los Angeles in 1999. He has taught at UCLA, and has been a senior research fellow at Oxford University and resident fellow at the École pratique des hautes études. He specializes in the history and culture of Ancient Persia.

He is the editor of the Name-ye Iran-e Bastan, The International Journal of Ancient Iranian Studies, DABIR: Digital Ar, as well as the director of Sasanika Project, a project on the history and culture of Sasanians. His most famous publications include Sasanian Persia: The Rise and Fall of an Empire and Sasanian Iran (224-651 CE): Portrait of a Late Antique Empire. He has also edited a book on Iranian history from the prehistoric era to modern history.

== Publications ==
Daryaee is the author of a number of historical publications. His book, Sasanian Persia: The Rise and Fall of an Empire, in 2010 received multiple awards by BRISMES and the British-Kuwait Friendship Society Prize in Middle Eastern Studies.

=== Selected books ===
- The Parthian and Early Sasanian Empires: adaptation and expansion, eds. Vesta Sarkhosh Curtis, Michael Alram, Touraj Daryaee (Editor), Oxbow Press, Oxford, 2016.
- From Oxus to Euphrates: The World of Late Antique Iran, Ancient Iran Series, UCI Center for Persian Studies, 2016.
- Excavating an Empire: Achaemenid Persian in Longue Dureé, eds. T. Daryaee, A. Mousavi, Kh. Rezakhani, Mazda Publishers, 2014.
- Cyrus the Great: An Ancient Iranian King, ed. T. Daryaee, Afshar Publishers, 2014.
- On the Explanation of Chess and Backgammon: A Middle Persian Text, UCI Center for Persian Studies, 2016.
- Iranian Kingship, The Arab Conquest and Zoroastrian Apocalypse, Mumbai, 2012 (Governor Fellowship Lectures given in the K.R. Cama Oriental Institute)
- The Oxford Handbook of Iranian History, ed. by T. Daryaee, Oxford University Press, 2012.
- Bibliographika Sasanika: Bibliographical Guide to the Sasanian Empire, vol. I Years 1990–1999, in collaboration with E. Venetis, M. Alinia, Mazda Publishers, 2009.
- Scholars & Humanists: Iranian Studies in Henning and Taqizadeh Correspondences 1937–1966, in collaboration with I. Afshar and P. Ranjbar, Mazda Publishers, 2009.
- Iranistik: Deutschsprachige Zeitschrift fur iranistische Studien. Festschrift fur Erich Kettenhofen eds. T. Daryaee & O. Tabibzadeh, 5. Jahrgang, Heft 1&2, 2006-2007(2009)(Alexander von Humboldt Stiftung).
- Sasanian Persia: The Rise and Fall of an Empire, I.B. Tauris, London, 2009.
- Sasanian Iran (224-651 AD): Portrait of a Late Antique Empire, Mazda Publishers, 2008.
- World History: A Concise Thematic Analysis, 2 vols., Harlan Davidson, 2007.
- Soghoot-e Sasanian (The Fall of Sasanians) Iran's Historical Press, Tehran, 2005.
- Meno-ye Xrad: The Spirit of Wisdom. Essays in Memory of Ahmad Tafazzoli, eds. T. Daryaee and M. Omidsalar, Mazda Publishers, 2004.
- Shahrestaniha-i Eranshahr: A Middle Persian Text on Late Antique Geography, Epic and History, Costa Mesa, 2002.

=== Selected articles (English language) ===
- "Western and Central Eurasia 1200BCE - 900CE," The Cambridge World History: A World with States, Empires, and Networks, 1200 BCE-900 CE, ed. C. Benjamin, Vol. IV, Cambridge, 2015, pp. 272–295.
- "Alexander and the Arsacids in the Manuscript MU29," DABIR, vol. 1(1), 2015:
- "Zoroastrianism under Islamic Rule," The Wiley Blackwell Companion to Zoroastrianism, ed. M. Stausberg & Y. S.-D. Vevaina, 2015, pp. 103–118.
- T. Daryaee & M.C.A. Macdonald, A. Corcella, G. Fisher, M. Gibbs, A. Lewin, D. Violante, C. Whately, "Arabs and Empires before the Sixth Century," Arabs and Empires before Islam, ed. G. Fisher, Oxford, 2015, pp. 11–89.
- T. Daryaee & H. Munt, O. Edaibat, R. Hoyland, I. Toral-Neihoff, "Arabic and Persian Sources for Pre-Islamic Arabia," Arabs and Empires before Islam, ed. G. Fisher, Oxford, 2015, pp. 434–500.
- T. Daryaee & S. Malekzadeh, "Why was Kerdir Forgotten?," Iran Nameh: Festschirft for Ehsan Yarshater, vol. 30, no. 2, 2015, pp. 280–287.
- T. Daryaee & S. Malekzadeh, "The Performance of Pain and Remembrance in Late Antique Iran," The Silk Road, Vol. 12, 2014, pp. 57–64.
- "The Last Ruling Woman of Eranshahr: Queen Azarmigdux," International Journal of the Society of Iranian Archaeologists, Vol. 1, No. 1, Winter-Spring 2014, pp. 77–81.
- "The Achaemenid Empire in the Context of World History (550-330 BCE)," with Kh. Rezakhani in Excavating an Empire: Achaemenid Persia in Longue Dureé, eds. T. Daryaee, A. Mousavi, Kh. Rezakhani, Mazda Publishers, 2014.
- "Historiography in late antique Iran," in Perceptions of Iran: History, Myths and Nationalism from Medieval Persia to the Islamic Republic, ed. Ali Ansari, IB Taruis, London, 2014, pp. 65–76.
- "On the epithets of two Sasanian kings in the Mujmal al-tawarikh wa-l-qisas," in Ferdowsi, the Mongols and the History of Iran, Studies in Honour of Charles Melville, eds. R. Hillenbrand et al., I.B. Tauris, 2013, pp. 11–14.
- "Marriage, Property and Conversion among the Zoroastrians: From Late Sasanian to Islamic Iran," Journal of Persianate Studies, vol. 6, 2013, pp. 91–100.
- "The Sasanian Empire (224-651 CE)," Oxford Handbook of Iranian History, Oxford, 2012, pp. 187–207.
- "A Bulla of Eran-Spahbed of Nemroz," with K. Safdari, NAMVARNAMEH: Papers in Honour of Massoud Azarnoush, eds. H. Fahimi & K. Alizadeh, Tehran, 2012, pp. 163–166.
- "The Sasanian Empire," co-authored with A. Mousavi (Los Angeles County Museum of Art), A Companion to the Archaeology of the Ancient Near East, ed. D. Potts, Blackwell, Oxford (contract signed 2010). (UK)
- "The Achaemenid Empire in the Context of World History (550-330 BCE)," co-authored with Kh. Rezakhani, Excavating an Empire: The Persian Longue Durée, ed. A. Mousavi, Mazda Publishers, 2009 (forthcoming 2010). (US)
- "Bazaars, Merchants and Trade in Late Antique Iran," Comparative Studies of South Asia, Africa, and the Middle East, vol. 28, no. 1 (Duke University Press, forthcoming 2009). (US)
- "The last Ruling Woman of ?r?nšahr: Queen ?zarm?gduxt," A. Shapur Shahbazi Memorial Volume, ed. K. Abdi, Iran University Press, Tehran (forthcoming 2009). (Iran)
- "Ancient Iranian Studies in the 20th Century," Iranian Studies, vol. 42, no. 1 (forthcoming 2009). (US)
- "The Idea of Iranšahr: Jewish, Christian and Manichaean Views in Late Antiquity," Societas Iranologica Europaea – Proceedings, ed. C. Cereti & B. Teribili, Rome (forthcoming 2009). (Italy)
- "When the End is Near: Barbarized Armies and Barracks Kings of Late Antique Iran," Iranica, ed. M. Macuch, Harrassowitz Verlag, Wiesbaden (forthcoming 2009). (Germany)
- "Shapur II," Encyclopædia Iranica http://www.iranica.com/newsite/ 2009
- "Abarqubadh," The Encyclopaedia of Islam, Third Edition, Part 2009-1.
- "A Bulla of the ?r?n-Sp?hbed of N?mr?z," co-author with K. Safdari, e-Sasanika 8, 2009 (UCI):
- "Some Observations on Middle Persian Zandig," Feschrfit for Dr. Badr ol-Zaman Gharib, ed. Z. Zarshenas & V. Naddaf, Tahuri Publishers, Tehran, 2008, pp. 19–32.
- "Yazdgerd III's Last Year: Coinage and History of Sistan at the End of Late Antiquity," Iranistik: Deutschsprachige Zeitschrift fur iranistische Studien. Festschrift fur Erich Kettenhofen eds. T. Daryaee & O. Tabibzadeh, 5. Jahrgang, Heft 1&2, 2006-2007(2009), pp. 21–30.
- "The Persian Gulf in Late Antiquity: The Sasanian Era (200-700 C.E.)," The Persian Gulf in History, ed. L.G. Potter, Palgrave, New York, 2009.
- "Kingship in Early Sasanian Iran," The Sasanian Era: The Idea of Iran, vol. III, eds. V. Sarkhosh Curtis and S. Stewart, London, 2008, pp. 60–70.
- "Indo-European Elements in the Zoroastrian Apocalyptic Tradition," Classical Bulletin, vol. 83, no. 2, 2007, pp. 203–213.
- "The Mysteries of the House of Sasan: When did Ardaxš?r Rule over Istakhr?," Bastanpazhouhi, vol. 2, no. 4, 2007, pp. 15–20.
- "List of Fruits and Nuts in the Zoroastrian Tradition: An Irano-Hellenic Classification," Name-ye Iran-e Bastan, The International Journal of Ancient Iranian Studies, vols. 11/12, 2006–2007, pp. 1–10.
- "Imitatio Alexandri and Its Impact on Late Arsacid, Early Sasanian and Middle Persian Literature," Electrum, Studies in Ancient History, vol. 12, 2007, pp. 89–94.
- "The Middle Persian Text Sur i Saxwan and the Late Sasanian Court," Des Indo-Grecs aux Sassanides: Donnees pour l'historie et la geographie historique, Res Orientales XVII, 2007, pp. 65–72.
- "The Construction of the Past in Late Antique Persia," Historia, Zeitschrift für Alte Geschichte, vol. 55, no. 4, 2006, pp. 493–503.
- "The Art of Wine in Ancient Persia," Hamazor, Publication of the world Zoroastrian organization, vol. 1, 2006, pp. 34–36.
- "A Note on the Great Seal of Peroz and Middle Persian NYCNY," Indo-Iranian Journal, vol. 48, Nos. 3–4, 2005, pp. 195–197.
- "Sasanians and their Ancestors," Societas Iranologica Europoea – Proceedings, ed. A. Panaino and A. Piras, vol. I, Milano, 2005, pp. 287–293.
- "Ethnic and Territorial Boundaries in Late Antique and Early Medieval Persia (Third to Tenth Century)," Borders, Barriers, and Ethnogenesis, Frontiers in Late Antiquity and Middle Ages, ed. F. Curta, Brepols, 2005, pp. 123–137.
- "The 'Bow of Rustam' and the 'Gleaming Armor' of the Parthians: Notes on the Parthian Epic Ayadgar i Zareran," Electrum: Studies in Ancient History, vol. 10, 2005, pp. 95–98.
- "Notes on Early Sasanian Tiulature," Journal of the Society for Ancient Numismatics, vol. 21, 2002(2005), pp. 41–44.
- "Das Uberleben eines sehr alten persischen Titels in Zentralasien," Iranistik, Deutschprachige Zeitschrift fur iranistische Studien, vol. 3, no. 1, 2004, pp. 41–48.
- "History, Epic, and Numismatics: On the Title of Yazdgerd I (Ramšahr)," Journal of the American Numismatic Society, vol. 14, 2002(2003), pp. 89–95.
- "The Effect of the Arab Muslim Conquest on the Administrative Division of Sasanian Persis/Far," Iran: The British Institute of Persian Studies, vol. 31, 2003, pp. 193–204.
- "Gayomard: King of Clay or Mountain? The epithet of the First Man in the Zoroastrian Tradition," Paitimana, Essays in Iranian, Indo-European, and Indian Studies in Honor of Hanns-Peter Schmidt, Mazda Press, 2003, pp. 339–349.
- "The Mazdean sect of Gayomartiya," Atash-e Dorun (The Fire Within), Jamshid Soroush Soroushian Memorial Volume, ed. C. Cereti, 2003, pp. 131–137.
- "The Persian Gulf Trade in Late Antiquity," Journal of World History, vol. 14, no. 1, 2003, pp. 1–16.
- "Sight, Semen, and the Brain: Ancient Persian Notions of Physiology in Old and Middle Iranian Texts," The Journal of Indo-European Studies, vol. 30, nos. 1&2, 2002, pp. 1–26.
- "Mind, Body, and the Cosmos: Chess and Backgammon in Ancient Persia," Iranian Studies, vol. 35, no. 4, 2002, pp. 281–312.
- "The Coinage of Queen Boran and Its Significance for Late Sasanian Imperial Ideology," Bulletin of the Asia Institute: Volume 13, 1999(2002), pp. 1–6.
- "The Changing ‘image of the World’: Geography and Imperial Propaganda in Ancient Persia," Electrum, Studies in Ancient History, vol. 6, 2002, pp. 99-109.
- "Two Recently Discovered Inscribed Sasanian Silver Bowls," in collaboration with Judith Lerner and Dayoush Akbarzadeh, Bulletin of the Asia Institute, vol. 15, 2001 (2005), pp. 71–76.
- "Kave the Black-Smith: An Indo-Iranian Fashioner?," Studien zur Indologie und Iranistik, Vol. 22, 1999(2001), pp. 9–21.
- "Sources for the Economic History of Late Sasanian Fars," Matériaux pour l’Histoire Économique du Monde Iranien, Studia Iranica Cahier 21, 1999(2000), pp. 131–148.
- "Sasanian Persia (224-651 AD)," The Journal of Society for Iranian Studies, vol. 31, no. 3–4, 1998(2000), pp. 431–462.
- "Middle Iranian Sources for the Study of Medieval Islamic History," (MEM) The Bulletin of Middle East Medievalist, Vol. 10, No. 2, Oct. 1998, pp. 36–39.
- "Apocalypse Now: Zoroastrian Reflection on the Early Islamic Centuries," Medieval Encounters, Vol. 4, No. 3, Nov. 1998, pp. 188–202.
- "The Use of Religio-Political Propaganda on Coins of Xusro II," in The Journal of the American Numismatic Society, Vol. 7, November 1997, pp. 41–54.
- "The Effect of Civil War on the Mint Production in the Sasanian Empire," Oriental Numismatic Society No. 150, Autumn 1996, pp. 8–9.
- "Keyanid History or National History? The Natue of Sasanian Zoroastrian Historiography," The Journal of the Society for Iranian Studies, vol. 28, Nos. 3–4, 1995, pp. 121–145.

=== Selected articles (Persian language) ===
- "Two Notes on the Mythological Geography of Iranians," Studia Persica, Sot?deh N?ma, ed. I. Afshar, Tehran, 2005, vol. 15 pp. 345–349.
- "Ardašir i Babakan and the Decapitated [sic] Heads at the Anahita Fire-Temple," Iranshenasi, A Journal of Iranian Studies, vol. xvi, no. 4, winter 2005, pp. 659–662.
- "The Middle Persian Inscription of Seluk at Persepolis," Farhang: The Quarterly Journal of Humanities and Cultural Studies, vol. 17, nos. 49–50, 2004, pp. 47–53.
- "Royal and Communal Views of ?r?nšahr in the Sassanian Period," Name-ye Iran-e Bastan, The International Journal of Ancient Iranian Studies, Vol.3, no. 2, 2003–2004, pp. 11–27.
- "The Sons and Grandsons’ of Yazdgird III in China," Iranshenasi, A Journal of Iranian Studies, vol. xv, no. 3, autumn 2003, pp. 540-548.
- "Some Notes on Religion and State During the Sasanian Period," Sorush-e Mogan, Jamš?d Sor?sh??n Memorial Volume, ed. K. Mazdapur, Tehran, 2002, pp. 167–177.
- "The Inscription of Šabuhr Saganšah at Persepolis," Farhang, Quarterly Journal of Humanities and Cultural Studies, vol. 14, nos. 37–38, summer 2001, pp. 107–114.
- "Zed-e Zandiyun in the Sasanian and Early Islamic Period," Ma’arif, vol. 18, no. 2, 2001, pp. 51–57.
- "Kerdir's Naqsh-e Rajab Inscription," Name-ye Iran-e Bastan, The International Journal of Ancient Iranian Studies, vol. 1, no. 1, 2001, pp. 3–10.
- "Notes on the Middle Persian Text, The Šahrestaniha I Eranšahr," Iranshenasi, vol. Xii, no. 4, winter 2001, pp. 795–801.
- "Trends in the Study of Ancient History in the United States and Europe," Bukhara, vol. 3, no. 16, Jan-Feb. 2001, pp. 21–26.
- "The Judge and Protector of the Needy during the Sasanian Period," Tafazzoli Memorial Volume, ed. A.A. Sadeghi, Tehran, 2001, pp. 179–187.
- "The Pahlavi Title of Čihr az Yazdan and the Sassanian Kings," Name-ye Farhangestan, The Quarterly Journal of Iranian Academy of Persian Language and Literature, Vol. 4, No. 4 (Ser. No. 16), November 2000, pp. 28–32.
- "The Wonders and Worthiness of Sistan," Iranshenasi, A Journal of Iranian Studies, Vol. VIII, No. 3, Autumn 1996, pp. 534–542.

== See also ==
- Nasrin Rahimieh
