= Al-Ash'ath ibn Qays =

Arab Rashidun military commander (died 661)

al-Ashʿath ibn Qays الأشعث بن قيس

Governor of Adharbayjan
- In office 655–657
- Monarchs: Uthman, Ali

Personal details
- Born: 599 Eastern Hadhramawt, South Arabia
- Died: 661 Kufa, Iraq
- Spouse: Umm Farwa bint Abi Quhafa (sister of Abu Bakr)
- Children: Muhammad; Qays; Ja'da; Habbana; Qariba
- Parent(s): Qays ibn Ma'dikarib; Kabsha bint Shurahbil
- Relatives: Abd al-Rahman (grandson); Kinda (tribe)

Military service
- Allegiance: Kindite rebels (632–633); Rashidun Caliphate (636–657)
- Battles/wars: Ridda Wars; Muslim conquest of Persia; Battle of al-Qadisiyyah; Siege of Ctesiphon; Battle of Jalula; Battle of Nahavand; First Fitna; Battle of Siffin; Battle of Nahrawan

Abū Muḥammad Maʿdīkarib ibn Qays ibn Maʿdīkarib (599–661), better known as al-Ashʿath (Arabic: الأشعث), was a chief of the Kinda tribe of Hadhramawt and founder of a leading noble Arab household in Kufa, one of the two main garrison towns and administrative centers of Iraq under the Rashidun (632–661) and Umayyad (661–750) caliphs.

Al-Ash'ath embraced Islam in the presence of the Islamic prophet Muhammad only to leave the faith following the latter's death in 632. He led his tribesmen against the Muslims during the Ridda Wars but surrendered during a siege of his fortress, after which many Kindites were executed. He was imprisoned, but pardoned by Caliph Abu Bakr (r. 632–634) upon his repentance. Al-Ash'ath joined the Muslim conquests of Mesopotamia and Persia, fighting in several battles between 636 and 642. He settled in the newly-founded garrison city of Kufa and became the leader of his tribesmen there. Under Caliph Uthman (r. 644–656), al-Ash'ath governed Adharbayjan. In 657, he fought as a commander in the Battle of Siffin for Caliph Ali (r. 656–661) against Mu'awiya, but supported an end to the battle by arbitration, for which generally pro-Alid sources consider him a traitor. When Mu'awiya became caliph after Ali was assassinated in 661, the position of al-Ash'ath and his family was strengthened in Kufa, where he soon after died.

He was succeeded by his son Muhammad as leader of the Kufan Kindites, while his grandson, known as 'Ibn al-Ash'ath' after him, led an abortive mass Iraqi rebellion against the Umayyads in 701. Al-Ash'ath's later descendants, the Asha'itha, lacked their ancestors' influence, but continued to play political, military, or cultural roles in Iraq well into the early decades of Abbasid rule (750–1258). Among them was the famous 9th-century philosopher al-Kindi.

== Origins ==
Al-Ash'ath's name was Ma'dikarib ibn Qays. (Note: Al-Ash'ath's full name and genealogy was Maʿdīkarib ibn Qays ibn Maʿdīkarib ibn Muʾāwiya ibn Jabala ibn ʿAdī ibn Rabīʿa ibn Muʾāwiya al-Akramīn ibn al-Ḥārith ibn Muʾāwiya ibn al-Ḥārith ibn Muʾāwiya ibn Thawr ibn Murattiʿ ibn Kinda.) He earned the nickname al-Ashʿath ('the dishevelled') because he was known to have dishevelled hair. His nickname possibly derived from his status as a warrior, being unconcerned with his physical appearance and luxury. He is also known, though less frequently, by the epithets al-Ashajj, 'the scar-faced', and ʿUrf al-Nār, allegedly a South Arabian term for 'traitor'. He was born around 599 CE in the eastern Hadhramawt region of South Arabia. His father, Qays ibn Ma'dikarib, was a convert to Judaism which, in his time, had become widespread in South Arabia, including among al-Ash'ath's tribe, the Kinda. Al-Ash'ath was probably also Jewish before his later conversion to Islam.

Like his father and grandfather, al-Ash'ath was a chief of the Banu Jabala house, a clan of the Kinda's main division, the Banu Mu'awiya. The Banu Mu'awiya's preeminent branch during the pre-Islamic period had been the Banu Amr. To the latter belonged the houses of Banu Akil al-Murar, whose chiefs had served as the kings of Ma'add in central Arabia in c. 450–550, and the Banu Wali'a, the most prominent Kindite clan in the tribe's heartland of Hadhramawt. The Banu Jabala belonged to a less important branch of the Banu Mu'awiya, the Banu Harith al-Asghar, but its star began to rise under al-Ash'ath or his father. Al-Ash'ath's mother, Kabsha bint Shurahbil ibn Yazid ibn Imri al-Qays ibn Amr al-Maqsur, belonged to the Banu Akil al-Murar, while his wife belonged to the parent clan of the Banu Wali'a; both relationships provided him links with the main families of the Banu Amr.

The Kindite chiefs were considered 'kings', in light of their tribe's previous kingship over the Arabs of central Arabia, but by the eve of Islam in the 620s, their individual realms were limited to single valleys or forts in the Hadhramawt. Al-Ash'ath's family, from the time of his grandfather Ma'dikarib, held the fort of al-Nujayr in the far north of the Hadhramawt. Before his embrace of Islam in late 631, al-Ash'ath launched an expedition against the tribe of Murad, whose members had killed his father Qays. However, his assault was repulsed and he was taken captive. In return for his release, he paid the Murad 3,000 camels as a ransom. The historian Michael Lecker considers this an exaggeration whose purpose was to demonstrate al-Ash'ath's status in South Arabia, paying a ransom thrice as high as that of a typical king.

== Rebellion in the Ridda wars ==
In 631, al-Ash'ath led a delegation of Kindites to the Islamic prophet Muhammad and converted to Islam. (Note: The 8th-century biographer of Muhammad, Ibn Ishaq, claims the Kindite delegation was composed of eighty men, a number which the modern historian Werner Caskel, considers exaggerated. The 8th-century historian Ibn Sa'd estimates the Kindite delegation as roughly a dozen-strong.) After Muhammad's death in 632, al-Ash'ath and his tribe withheld the customary payment to the nascent Muslim state and apostatized during the Ridda wars, a series of rebellions and defections from the Muslim polity by the tribes of Arabia. The governor of the Hadhramawt, Ziyad ibn Labid al-Ansari, ambushed the Banu Amr, dealing them a severe blow, and proceeded to defeat other Kindite clans in minor skirmishes. Later in the war, the Banu Wali'a chiefs were all slain, leading the Banu Amr to confer leadership to al-Ash'ath, in exchange for his support, making him the most powerful chief of the Kinda.

Al-Ash'ath mobilized Kindites from his branch of the tribe against the Muslim forces of Ziyad, who were by then reinforced by another army led by al-Muhajir ibn Abi Umayya. Despite their inferior numbers, the Kindites under al-Ash'ath defeated the Muslims near Tarim, then besieged them there. After he showed his approval for the killing of Ziyad's messenger by a Kindite youth, many of his Kindite supporters abandoned him. Nonetheless, he defeated the larger Muslim army, whose ranks included many Kindites from the large Sakun division, at the valley of Zurqan. Afterward, the arrival of further Muslim forces under Ikrima ibn Abi Jahl prompted al-Ash'ath to lead his men and their families to barricade in the fortress of al-Nujayr, where they were besieged by the Muslims. Al-Ash'ath secured safe passage for a number of his relatives, but the rest of the besieged fighters were executed. He was spared but taken captive and sent to Caliph Abu Bakr (r. 632–634), who agreed to release him after he repented. He thereafter took up residence in Medina, capital of the caliphate, where he was married to Abu Bakr's sister, Umm Farwa. This was a rare honour, and none of the other leaders of the Ridda wars were similarly treated. As al-Ash'ath's principal wife, Umm Farwa bore him five children, including his oldest son, Muhammad.

== Career under the early caliphs ==
Under Caliph Umar (r. 634–644), the earliest Muslim converts had precedence in the administration and constituted the Muslim elite. Tribal chiefs who held power and prestige before Islam, including al-Ash'ath, resented the loss of their influence in the new order. As the early Muslim conquests were underway, Umar prohibited former apostates like al-Ash'ath from participating in the efforts and taking a share in the spoils. Nevertheless, the ban was eventually lifted and al-Ash'ath joined the army of Sa'd ibn Abi Waqqas, which was dispatched to conquer Iraq from the Sasanian Empire. During that campaign, he fought in the battles of al-Qadisiyyah, Ctesiphon, Jalula and Nahavand, between 636 and 642.

Through his participation in the conquests, al-Ash'ath raised his status in the Muslim community and gained power in Iraq, to the probable displeasure of the initial Muslim settlers there. He gained a piece of land and a house in Kufa, one of the two chief Arab garrison towns of Iraq. The city was organized along tribal lines and al-Ash'ath lived in the Kindite neighborhood. He vied for paramountcy over the Kindite soldiery of Kufa with another prominent member of the Banu Jabala, Shurahbil ibn Simt. Shurahbil had gained favor with Sa'd ibn Abi Waqqas, the founder and governor of Kufa, prompting al-Ash'ath to make intrigues with the prominent army leader Jarir ibn Abd Allah al-Bajali, who lodged complaints about Shurahbil to Umar. The latter consequently ordered Shurahbil to Syria, and thus al-Ash'ath's leadership of the Kufan Kindites was assured.

Caliph Uthman (r. 644–656) appointed al-Ash'ath as the governor of Adharbayjan in 655, and his daughter Habbana was married to Uthman's eldest living son. Another of his daughters, Qariba, was also married to a member of Uthman's family. Marital relations between al-Ash'ath's family and those of the caliphs was indicative of his high social standing. Under the recommendation of Uthman, al-Ash'ath exchanged his land in Hadhramawt for a caliphal-owned estate in the village of Tiznabadh in the fertile Sawad, near Kufa. The enrichment and empowerment of latecomers to the faith like al-Ash'ath provoked the early converts in Kufa, who became known as the qurra (Quran readers), to oppose Uthman.

The opposition to Uthman culminated with his assassination in 656. His successor, Caliph Ali (r. 656–661), drew the opposition of key Qurayshite leaders, who mobilized against him in Basra, the other major garrison town of Iraq. To better face this challenge, Ali established himself in Kufa. In the view of the historian Hugh N. Kennedy, it "helped" Ali that al-Ash'ath and other key tribal leaders were posted in Iran at the time and only returned to Kufa after Ali was widely recognized there.

=== Role during the First Fitna ===
Al-Ash'ath and his large tribal following served under Ali and commanded the right wing of the caliph's army at the Battle of Siffin against Mu'awiya ibn Abi Sufyan, the rebelling governor of Syria and opponent of Ali's caliphate, in 657. The battle between Ali's Iraqi army and Mu'awiya's Syrian army ended in an agreement to hold an arbitration over leadership of the caliphate. There was significant support among Ali's Iraqi troops for settling the dispute, including from al-Ash'ath. He expressed alarm that the enemies of the Muslims would take advantage of their internal strife. Kennedy notes that al-Ash'ath's firsthand experience in Iran, which was yet to be pacified, guided his support for arbitration, as well as a desire not to strengthen Ali in view of his heavy reliance on the qurra and his patronization of a rival leader of the Kufan Kindites, Hujr ibn Adi.

According to al-Tabari, al-Ash'ath influenced Ali's appointment of Abu Musa al-Ash'ari, a prominent Muslim of South Arabian origin, as his representative at the arbitration, instead of Ali's initial choice, his cousin, Abd Allah ibn Abbas. As the arbitration diminished Ali's standing, it fractured his coalition; a segment of his army rejected the settlement and seceded, becoming known as the Kharijites. Because of this fallout, al-Ash'ath, who had pushed for peace due to tribal solidarity and his own calculation of political survival, was accused by later pro-Shi'a sources of treason. The real events remain unclear. Al-Ash'ath was certainly close to Ali's Umayyad rivals, and had no part in Uthman's murder, and likely felt that he could accommodate himself with them.

Following their secession, elements of the Kharijites killed Abd Allah, the son of Muhammad's companion Khabbab, for unknown reasons, and subsequently refused to hand the responsible parties over to Ali. Al-Ash'ath strongly demanded that Ali punish the perpetrators and actively fought against them at the Battle of Nahrawan in 658. His daughter Ja'da subsequently married Ali's son Hasan. Ja'da is accused in some sources of poisoning and murdering al-Hasan, though the historian Asad Q. Ahmed notes this "is very likely an elaboration of ʿAlīd propaganda against al-Ash'ath". After Ali was assassinated in January 661, Mu'awiya soon after gained general recognition as caliph. Kennedy comments that his "triumph was the triumph" of the tribal chiefs of Kufa, especially al-Ash'ath and his son Muhammad, who prospered under the new regime, over their challengers, including Hujr ibn Adi, "who felt betrayed and resentful".

== Death and descendants ==
Al-Ash'ath died in Kufa in 661. His descendants, referred to in the Muslim sources as the Asha'itha, were one of the most prominent families of the Arab tribal nobility in Iraq. His sons Qays and Muhammad succeeded him as leader of the Kufan Kindites. The former commanded the Kindite fighters in the Umayyad army against Husayn ibn Ali at the Battle of Karbala in 680, while the latter was a commander under the anti-Umayyad governor of Basra, Mus'ab ibn al-Zubayr. Muhammad's sons Ishaq, Qasim, and Sabbah all fought campaigns in Tabaristan, while his son Abd al-Rahman, better known as Ibn al-Ash'ath, led a mass Iraqi revolt against the Umayyads in 700–701, which ended in defeat and greatlly diminished status of the Iraqi soldiery of Kufa and Basra.

The family's political influence declined substantially by the time of its fourth generation. Two of Ishaq's sons, Muhammad and Uthman, joined the anti-Umayyad Iraqi rebellion of Yazid ibn al-Muhallab in 720. Ishaq's grandson, Mundhir ibn Muhammad, led the Kindite division of an Umayyad army against the Alid rebel Zayd ibn Ali in 740. Ishaq's great-grandson, Talha ibn Ishaq ibn Muhammad, was a deputy governor of Kufa under the Abbasids in 759, while a great-grandson of Ism'ail, Ishaq ibn al-Sabbah ibn Imran, served in the same capacity in 778–781 and briefly under Caliph Harun al-Rashid (r. 786–809). The prominent Arab philosopher, al-Kindi (d. 873), was a seventh-generation descendant of al-Ash'ath.

Genealogical chart of al-Ash'ath's descendants

al-Ash'ath
Muhammad	Qays	Ja'da	Qariba	Habbana
al-Qasim	Abd al-Rahman	Ishaq	Isma'il	Sabbah
Muhammad	Uthman	Imran
Ishaq	Mundhir	Sabbah
Talha	Ishaq	Muhammad
Ya'qub (al-Kindi)	Fadl

== Bibliography ==
- Ahmed, Asad Q. (2011). The Religious Elite of the Early Islamic Ḥijāz: Five Prosopographical Case Studies. Oxford: University of Oxford Linacre College Unit for Prosopographical Research. ISBN 978-1-900934-13-8.
- Blankinship, Khalid Yahya (2009). "al-Ashʿath b. Qays". In Fleet, Kate; Krämer, Gudrun; Matringe, Denis; Nawas, John; Rowson, Everett (eds.). Encyclopaedia of Islam (3rd ed.). Brill Online. ISSN 1873-9830.
- Caskel, Werner (1966). Ğamharat an-nasab: Das genealogische Werk des His̆ām ibn Muḥammad al-Kalbī, Volume II (in German). Leiden: Brill.
- Crone, Patricia (1980). Slaves on Horses: The Evolution of the Islamic Polity (1980 ed.). Cambridge: Cambridge University Press. ISBN 978-0521229616.
- Donner, Fred M., ed. (1993). The History of al-Ṭabarī, Volume X: The Conquest of Arabia, A.D. 632–633/A.H. 11. SUNY Series in Near Eastern Studies. Albany, New York: State University of New York Press. ISBN 978-0-7914-1071-4.
- Hawting, Gerald R. (2000). The First Dynasty of Islam: The Umayyad Caliphate AD 661–750 (Second ed.). London and New York: Routledge. ISBN 0-415-24072-7.
- Ibrahim, Mahmood (1990). Merchant Capital and Islam. Austin: University of Texas Press. ISBN 978-0-292-74118-8.
- Kennedy, Hugh (2004) [1986]. The Prophet and the Age of the Caliphates: The Islamic Near East from the 6th to the 11th Century (Second ed.). Harlow: Longman. ISBN 978-0-582-40525-7.
- Landau-Tasseron, Ella, ed. (1998). The History of al-Ṭabarī, Volume XXXIX: Biographies of the Prophet's Companions and their Successors: al-Ṭabarī's Supplement to his History. SUNY Series in Near Eastern Studies. Albany, New York: State University of New York Press. ISBN 978-0-7914-2819-1.
- Lecker, Michael (November 1994). "Kinda on the Eve of Islam and during the "Ridda"". Journal of the Royal Asiatic Society. 4 (3): 333–356. doi:10.1017/S1356186300005964. JSTOR 25182938. S2CID 162695659.
- Lecker, Michael (October–December 1995). "Judaism among Kinda and the Ridda of Kinda". Journal of the American Oriental Society. 115 (4): 635–650. doi:10.2307/604732. JSTOR 604732.
- Madelung, Wilferd (1997). The Succession to Muhammad: A Study of the Early Caliphate. Cambridge University Press. ISBN 978-0-521-64696-3.
- Reckendorf, H. (1960). "al-As̲h̲ʿat̲h̲". In Gibb, H. A. R.; Kramers, J. H.; Lévi-Provençal, E.; Schacht, J.; Lewis, B. & Pellat, Ch. (eds.). The Encyclopaedia of Islam, Second Edition. Volume I: A–B. Leiden: E. J. Brill. pp. 696–697. OCLC 495469456.
- Veccia Vaglieri, L. (1971). "Ibn al-As̲h̲ʿat̲h̲". In Lewis, B.; Ménage, V. L.; Pellat, Ch. & Schacht, J. (eds.). The Encyclopaedia of Islam, Second Edition. Volume III: H–Iram. Leiden: E. J. Brill. pp. 715–719. OCLC 495469525.
- Timani, Hussam S. (2008). Modern Intellectual Readings of the Kharijites. Peter Lang. ISBN 978-0-8204-9701-3.
- Hagemann, Hannah-Lena (2021). The Kharijites in Early Islamic Historical Tradition: Heroes and Villains. Edinburgh: Edinburgh University Press. ISBN 978-1-4744-5088-1.
- Humphreys, R. Stephen, ed. (1990). The History of al-Ṭabarī, Volume XV: The Crisis of the Early Caliphate: The Reign of ʿUthmān, A.D. 644–656/A.H. 24–35. SUNY Series in Near Eastern Studies. Albany, New York: State University of New York Press. ISBN 978-0-7914-0154-5.
