= Battle of al-Qadisiyyah =

Part of the Muslim conquest of Persia (636 CE)

- Part of the Muslim conquest of Persia
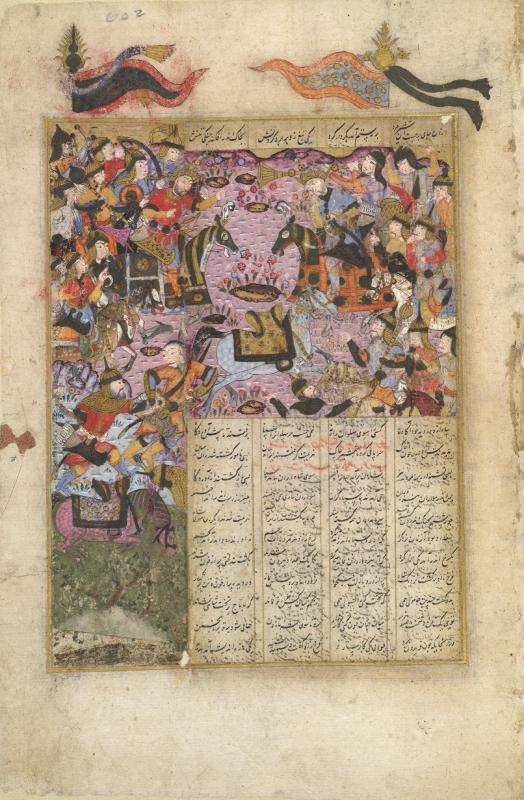
- Depiction of the battle from a manuscript of the Persian epic Shahnameh, 1614
Date	16–19 November 636
Location	Al-Qadisiyyah, Sasanian Empire 31°35′N 44°30′E
Result	Rashidun victory
Territorial changes	Beginning of the Rashidun siege of Ctesiphon in January 637

Belligerents
Rashidun Caliphate	Sasanian Empire

Commanders and leaders
Sa'd ibn Abi Waqqas; Khalid ibn Urfuta; Al-Muthanna ibn Haritha; Al-Qa'qa ibn Amr al-Tamimi; Asim ibn Amr al-Tamimi; Abd Allah ibn al-Mu'tam; Shurahbil ibn Simt; Zuhra ibn al-Hawiyya; Jarir ibn Abd Allah al-Bajali; Tulayha ibn Khuwaylid; Amr ibn Ma'adi Yakrib	Rostam Farrokhzad †; Bahman Jadhuyah †; Hormuzan; Jalinus †; Shahriyar bin Kanara †; Mihran Razi; Piruz Khosrow; Kanara; Grigor II Novirak †; Tiruyah; Mushegh III Mamikonian †; Jevansher (WIA); Nakhiragan

Units involved
Rashidun army	Sasanian army

Strength
30,000	50,000–100,000

Casualties and losses
Heavy	Heavy
- Location within modern-day Iraq

The Battle of al-Qadisiyyah (Note: Alternatively spelled Qadisiyah, Qadisiyya, Ghadesiyeh, or Kadisiya.) (Arabic: مَعْرَكَة ٱلْقَادِسِيَّة, romanized: Maʿrakat al-Qādisīya; Persian: نبرد قادسیه, romanized: Nabard-i Qādisiya) took place between the armies of the Rashidun Caliphate and the Sasanian Empire in November 636. It resulted in a decisive victory for the Rashidun army and is considered to be one of the most significant engagements of the Muslim conquest of Persia, and thereby of the early Muslim conquests as a whole. After losing al-Qadisiyyah, the Sasanian army was left unable to defend against the Rashidun siege of Ctesiphon, thus being forced to retreat from all of Mesopotamia. This development enabled further Rashidun offensives into the Persian mainland and culminated in the Sasanian Empire's annexation by 651.

It is widely believed that the Rashidun army's advance on al-Qadisiyyah began on 16 November 636 and continued for the next three days. During the battle, Sasanian troops were thrown into disarray following the death of their general Rustam Farrokhzad under uncertain circumstances. The ensuing collapse of their positions marked a cataclysmic defeat that led to the Rashidun army's seizure of Ctesiphon, which had served as the Persian capital city since the Parthian period.

The Rashidun Caliphate's success in capturing al-Qadisiyyah was key to conquering the Sasanian province of Asoristan, and was followed by major engagements at Jalula and Nahavand. The battle allegedly saw the establishment of an alliance between the Sasanian Empire and the Byzantine Empire. This purported alliance, for the Byzantines, was motivated by the contemporary Rashidun invasion of the Levant and Egypt.

In 2024, scholars and researchers from Durham University and the University of al-Qadisiyyah identified the likely site of the battle to an open field situated approximately 19 kilometres (12 mi) to the south of modern-day Kufa.

== Background ==
=== Byzantine–Sasanian War of 602–628 ===
After the assassination of Byzantine emperor Maurice by pretender Emperor Phocas, the shah of the Sasanian Empire, Khosrow II, declared war on the Byzantine Empire, starting the Byzantine–Sasanian War of 602–628. Forces of the Sasanian Empire invaded and captured Syria, Egypt, and Anatolia, and carried the True Cross away in triumph.

After being deposed in 610, Phocas was succeeded by Heraclius, who led the Byzantines in a war of reconquest, successfully regaining territory lost to the Sasanians. Heraclius defeated a small Persian army at the final Battle of Nineveh and advanced towards Ctesiphon.

During this period, Khosrow II was overthrown and executed by one of his sons, Kavadh II. Kavadh subsequently made peace with the Byzantines and returned all captured territories as well as the True Cross. The Göktürks, who were attacking the north of Persia with a massive army during the peace proceedings, were ordered by Heraclius to retreat after the signing of the pact with Kavadh.

=== Sasanian Civil War of 628–632 ===
After a few short months of reign, Kavadh II suddenly died of the plague; the ensuing power vacuum quickly led to a civil war. Ardashir III (c. 621–630), son of Kavadh II, was raised to the throne at age seven, but was killed 18 months later by his general, Shahrbaraz, who then declared himself ruler. In 613 and 614, Shahrbaraz took both Damascus and Jerusalem from the Byzantine Empire, respectively.

On 9 June 629, Shahrbaraz was killed during an invasion from Armenia by a Khazar–Göktürk force under Chorpan Tarkhan. He was succeeded by Boran, a daughter of Khosrow II. She was the 26th sovereign monarch of Persia, ruling from 17 June 629 to 16 June 630, and was one of only two women to sit on the Sasanian throne, the other being her sister Azarmidokht (r. 630–631). She was made empress regnant on the understanding that she would vacate the throne upon Yazdegerd III (632–651), the son of Shahriyar and grandson of Khosrow II, attaining majority.

Boran attempted to bring stability to the empire by implementing justice, reconstructing and fixing infrastructure, lowering taxes, minting coins, and signing a peace treaty with the Byzantine Empire. She also appointed Rustam Farrokhzād as the commander-in-chief of the Persian army.

However, Boran was largely unsuccessful in restoring power to the central authority, which had been weakened considerably by civil wars, and either resigned or was murdered soon after ascending to the throne. She was replaced by her sister Azarmidokht, who in turn was replaced by Hormizd VI, a noble of the Persian court.

After five years of internal power struggle, Yazdegerd III, grandson of Khosrow II, became emperor at the age of eight in 632. The real power of the Persian state was held in the hands of generals Rustam Farrokhzād and Piruz Khosrow (also known as Piruzan).

The coronation of Yazdegerd III infused new life into the Sasanian Empire.

== First Muslim campaign ==
=== Muhammad's death and Rashidun wars ===
After the death of Muhammad, Abu Bakr established control over Arabia through the Ridda Wars and then launched campaigns against the remaining territories of Syria and Palestine. He triggered the chain of events that would in a few decades form one of the largest empires the world had ever seen. This put the nascent Islamic empire on a collision course with the Byzantine and Sasanian empires, which were the two superpowers of the time. The wars soon became a matter of conquest that would eventually result in the demise of the Sasanian Empire and the annexation of all of the Byzantine Empire's southern and eastern territories. To make victory certain, Abu Bakr decided that the invading army would consist entirely of volunteers and would be commanded by his best general, Khalid ibn al-Walid. Khalid won quick victories in four consecutive battles: the Battle of Chains, fought in April 633; the Battle of River, fought in the third week of April 633; the Battle of Walaja, fought in May 633; followed by the decisive Battle of Ullais, fought in mid-May, 633. By now the Persian Empire was struggling, and in the last week of May 633, the capital city of Iraq, Al-Hirah, fell to the Muslims after the Battle of Hira. Thereafter, the Siege of Al-Anbar during June–July 633 resulted in the surrender of the city after strong resistance. Khalid then moved towards the south and conquered the city of Ein ul Tamr after the Battle of Ayn al-Tamr in the final week of July 633. In November 633, the Persian counterattack was repulsed by Khalid. In December 633, Muslim forces reached the border city of Firaz, where Khalid defeated the combined Sasanian, Byzantine, and Christian Arab armies in the Battle of Firaz. This was the last battle in the conquest of Iraq.

=== Byzantine counteroffensive in the Levant ===
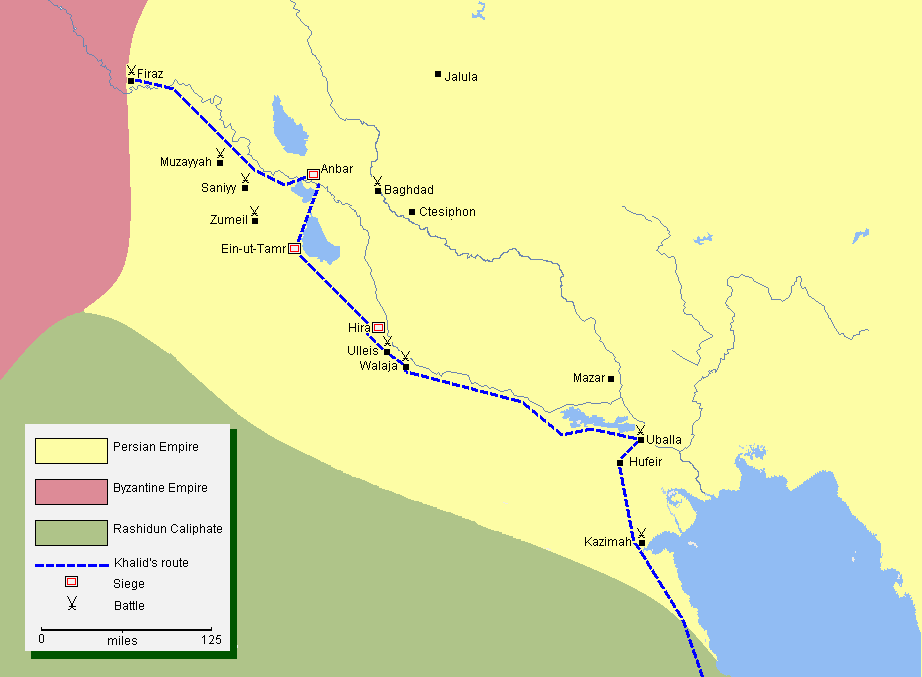
Map detailing the route of Khalid ibn Walid's conquest of Iraq

By this time, except for Ctesiphon, Khalid had captured all of Iraq. However, circumstances changed on the western front. The Byzantine army soon came into direct conflict in Syria and Palestine, and Khalid was sent with half of his army to deal with this new development. Soon after, Caliph Abu Bakr died in August 634 and was succeeded by Caliph Umar ibn al-Khattāb. Muslim forces in Iraq were too few in number to control the region. After the devastating invasion by Khalid, the Persians took time to recover; political instability was at its peak at Ctesiphon. Once the Persians recovered, they concentrated more troops and mounted a counterattack. Al-Muthanna ibn Haritha, who was now commander-in-chief of the Muslim forces in Iraq, pulled his troops back from all outposts and evacuated Al-Hirah. He then retreated to the region near the Arabian Desert. Meanwhile, Umar sent reinforcements from Madinah under the command of Abu Ubaid. The reinforcements reached Iraq in October 634, and Abu Ubaid assumed the command of the army and defeated the Sasanians at the Battle of Namaraq near modern-day Kufa. Then, in the Battle of Kaskar, he recaptured Hira.

=== Sasanian counteroffensive in Mesopotamia ===
The Persians launched another counterattack and defeated the Muslims at the Battle of the Bridge, which killed Abu Ubaid, and the Muslims suffered heavy losses. Muthanna then assumed command of the army and withdrew the remnant of his forces, about 3000 strong, across the Euphrates. The Persian commander Bahman (also known as Dhu al-Hajib) was committed to driving the Muslims away from Persian soil but was restrained from pursuing the defeated Muslims after being called back by Rustum to Ctesiphon, to help in putting down the revolt against him. Muthanna retreated near the frontier of Arabia and called for reinforcements. After getting sufficient reinforcements, he re-entered the fray and camped at the western bank of the Euphrates, where a Persian force intercepted him and was defeated.

After Khalid left Iraq for Syria, Suwad, the fertile area between the Euphrates and the Tigris, remained unstable. Sometimes it was occupied by the Persians and sometimes by the Muslims. This "tit-for-tat" struggle continued until emperor Yazdegerd III consolidated his power and sought an alliance with Heraclius in 635 in an effort to prepare for a massive counterattack. Heraclius then prepared for a major offensive in the Levant. Meanwhile, Yazdegerd ordered a concentration of massive armies to reclaim Iraq for good. This was supposed to be a well-coordinated attack by both emperors to annihilate the power of their common enemy, Caliph Umar.

When Heraclius launched his offensive in May 636, Yazdegerd could not coordinate on time, so the plan was not carried out as planned. Meanwhile, Umar allegedly had knowledge of this alliance and devised his own plan to counteract it. He wanted to finish the Byzantines first, and later deal with the Persians separately. Accordingly, he sent 6,000 soldiers as reinforcements to his army in Yarmouk who were facing off the Byzantine army. Simultaneously, Umar engaged Yazdegerd III, ordering Sa'd ibn Abi Waqqas to enter into peace negotiations with him by inviting him to convert to Islam. (Note: This was not a tactic of deception but an implementation of the command of Muhammad, who used to order his troops to call the enemy to Islam before engaging them in battle.) Heraclius, fearing the above-mentioned scenario had instructed his general Vahan not to engage in battle with Muslims and await his orders. However, Vahan, witnessing fresh reinforcements for the Muslims arriving daily from Madinah, felt compelled to attack the Muslim forces before they got too strong. Heraclius's imperial army was annihilated at Battle of Yarmouk in August 636, three months before the battle of Qadisiyyah, therefore ending the Roman Emperor's offensive in the west. Undeterred, Yazdegerd continued to execute his plan of attack and concentrated armies near his capital Ctesiphon. A large force was put under the control of veteran general Rustam and was cantoned at Valashabad near Ctesiphon. Receiving news of preparations for a massive counterattack, Umar ordered Muthana to abandon Iraq and retreat to the edge of the Arabian Desert. The Iraqi campaign would be addressed at a later date.

== Second Muslim campaign ==
=== Rashidun preparations ===
Caliph Umar started raising new armies from throughout Arabia with the intention of re-invading Iraq. Umar appointed Sa'd ibn Abī Waqqās, an important member of the Quraysh tribe as commander of this army. In May 636, Sa'd was instructed to march to Northern Arabia with a contingent of 4,000 men from his camp at Sisra (near Madinah) and take over command of the Muslim army, and immediately march onward to Iraq. Because of his inexperience as a general, he was instructed by Caliph Umar to seek the advice of experienced commanders before making critical decisions. Umar sent orders to him to halt at al-Qadisiyyah, a small town 30 miles from Kufah.

Umar continued to remotely issue strategic orders and commands to his army throughout the campaign. Due to a shortage of manpower, Umar decided to lift the ban on the ex-apostate tribes of Arabia from participating in state affairs. The army raised was not professional but a volunteer force composed of newly recruited contingents from all over Arabia. After a decisive victory against the Byzantine army at the Yarmouk, Umar sent immediate orders to Abu Ubaidah to send a contingent of veterans to Iraq. A force of 5,000 veterans of Yarmouk was also sent to Qadisiyyah, arriving on the second day of the battle there. This proved to be a major turning point and a major morale booster for the Muslim army. The battle of Qadisiyyah was fought predominantly between Umar and Rustam, rather than between Sa'd and Rustam. Coincidentally, the bulk of the Sasanian army was also made up of new recruits, since the bulk of the regular Sasanian forces was destroyed during the Battles of Walaja and Ullais.

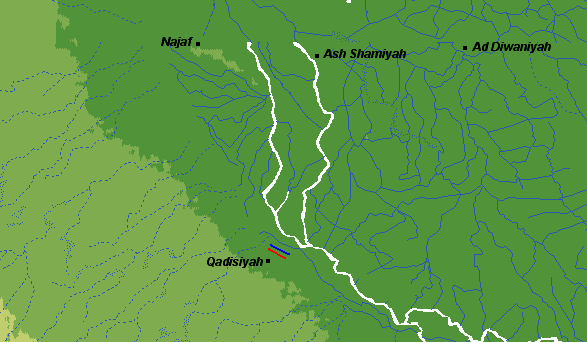
The site of the Battle of Qadisiyyah, showing Muslim army (in red) and Sasanian army (in blue)

Qadisiyyah was a small town on the west bank of the river Ateeq, a branch of the Euphrates. Al-Hira, the ancient capital of Lakhmid Dynasty, was about thirty miles west. According to present-day geography, it is situated in the southwest of al-Hillah and Kufah in Iraq. The precise location of the battlefield has been determined by archeologists at the University of Durham in England and the University of Al-Qadisiyah in Iraq, utilizing American declassified spy satellite imagery and historical texts describing the Darb Zubaydah (DZ), a Hajj pilgrimage road.

=== Troop strength and deployment ===
Modern estimates suggest that the size of the Sasanian forces was about 30,000 strong and that of the Muslims was around 30,000 strong after being reinforced by the Syrian contingent on the second day of the battle. These figures come from studying the logistical capabilities of the combatants, the sustainability of their respective bases of operations, and the overall manpower constraints affecting the Sasanians and Muslims. Most scholars, however, agree that the Sasanian army and their allies outnumbered the Muslims by a sizable margin.

==== Sasanian army ====
The Persian army reached Qadisiyyah in July 636 and established their highly fortified camps on the eastern bank of the Ateeq river. There was a bridge over the Ateeq river, the only crossing to the main Sasanian camps, although they had boats available in reserve to cross the river.

The Sasanian Persian army, about 60,000 strong, fell into three main categories, infantry, heavy cavalry, and the Elephant corps. The Elephant corps was also known as the Indian corps, for the elephants were trained and brought from Persian provinces in India. On 16 November 636, the Sasanian army crossed over the west bank of Ateeq, and Rustam deployed his 45,000 infantry in four divisions, each about 150 meters apart from the other. 15,000 cavalry were divided among four divisions to be used as a reserve for counter-attack and offensives. At Qadisiyyah, about 33 elephants were present, eight with each of the four divisions of the army. The battle front was about 4 km long. The Sasanian Persians' right wing was commanded by Hormuzan, the right centre by Jalinus, the rear guard by Piruzan, and the left wing by Mihran. Rustam himself was stationed at an elevated seat, shaded by a canopy, near the west bank of the river and behind the right centre, where he enjoyed a wide view of the battlefield. By his side waved the Derafsh-e-Kāveyān (in Persian: درفش کاویان, the 'flag of Kāveh'), the standard of the Sasanian Persians. Rustam placed men at certain intervals between the battlefield and the Sasanian capital, Ctesiphon, to transmit information.

==== Rashidun army ====
In July 636, the main Muslim army marched from Sharaf to Qadisiyyah. After establishing camp, organizing defences, and securing river heads, Sa'd sent parties inside Suwad to conduct raids. Sa'd was continuously in contact with Caliph Umar, to whom he sent a detailed report of the geographical features of the land where the Muslims encamped and the land between Qadisiyyah, Madinah, and the region where the Persians were concentrating their forces.

The Muslim army at this point was about 30,000 strong, including 7,000 cavalry. Its strength rose to 36,000 members once it was reinforced by the contingent from Syria and by local Arab allies. Sa'd developed sciatica, and had boils all over his body. He took a seat in the old royal palace at Qadisiyyah from where he directed the war operations and had a good view of the battlefield. He appointed as his deputy Khalid ibn Urfuta, who carried out his instructions to the battlefield through the chains of messengers. The Rashidun infantry was deployed in four corps, each with its own cavalry regiment stationed at the rear for counterattacks. Each corps was positioned about 150 meters from the other. The army was formed on a tribal and clan basis so that every man fought next to well-known comrades and so that tribes were held accountable for any weakness.

The Muslim forces wore gilded helmets similar to the silver helmets of the Sasanian soldiers. Chain Mail was commonly used to protect the face, neck, and cheeks, either as an aventail from the helmet or as a mail coif. Heavy leather sandals, as well as Roman-type sandal boots, were also typical of the early Muslim soldiers. Armor included hardened leather scale or lamellar armour and mail. The infantry was more heavily armoured than the cavalry. Hauberks and large wooden or wickerwork shields were used as well as long-shafted spears. Infantry spears were about 2.5 meters long and those of the cavalry were up to 5.5 meters long.

The swords used were similar to those of the Roman gladius and the Sasanian long sword. Both were worn and hung from a baldric. Bows were about two meters long when un-braced, about the same size as the famous English longbow, with a maximum range of about 150 meters. Muslim archers proved very effective against the opposing cavalry. The Rashidun troops at the Sasanian Persian front were lightly armoured compared to those deployed at the Byzantine front.

== Battle ==
The Arabs had been camped at al-Qadisiyyah with 30,000 men since July 636. Umar ordered Sa'd to send emissaries to Yazdegerd III and the general of the Sasanian army, Rustam Farrokhzad, inviting them to convert to Islam. For the next three months, negotiations between the Arabs and Persians continued. On Caliph Umar's instructions, Saad sent an embassy to the court of Persia with instructions to convert the Sasanian emperor to Islam or to get him to agree to pay the jizyah. An-Numan ibn Muqarrin led the Muslim emissary to Ctesiphon and met Sasanian Emperor Yazdgerd III, but the mission failed.

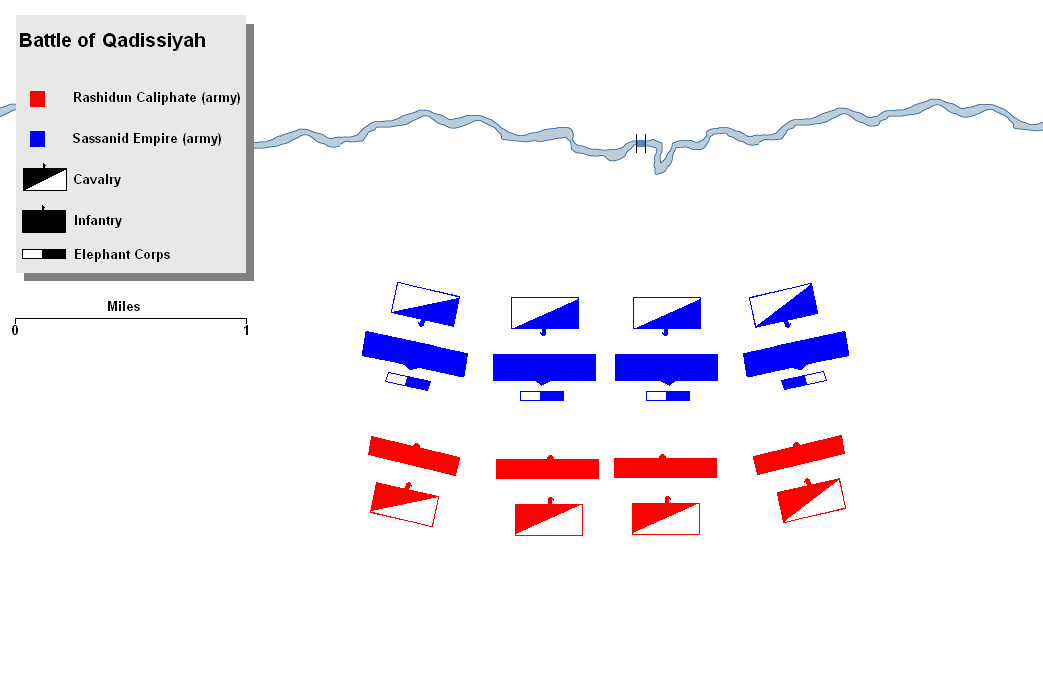
Tactical deployment

During one meeting, Yazdgerd III, intent on humiliating the Arabs, ordered his servants to place a basket full of earth on the head of Asim ibn 'Amr al-Tamimi, a member of the emissary. The optimistic Arab ambassador interpreted this gesture with the following words: "Congratulations! The enemy has voluntarily surrendered its territory to us," (referring to the earth in the basket). Rustam, the Persian general, held a view similar to Asim ibn 'Amr. He allegedly rebuked Yazdgerd III for the basket of the earth because it signified that the Persians voluntarily surrendered their land to the Muslims. Yazdgerd III, upon hearing this, ordered soldiers to pursue the Muslim emissaries and retrieve the basket. However, the emissaries were already at their base camp at that point. As tensions eased on the Syrian front, Caliph Umar instructed that negotiations be halted. This was an open signal to the Persians to prepare for battle. Rustam Farrokhzād, who was at Valashabad, broke camp for Qadisiyyah. He was inclined, however, to avoid fighting and once more opened peace negotiations. Sa'd sent Rabi bin Amir and later Mughirah bin Zurarah to hold talks. Rustam tried to incite Arabs to choose a peaceful outcome: "You are neighbours. Some of you were in our land and we were considerate of them and protected them from harm. We helped them in all manners. They brought their herd to graze in our pastures. We gave them foodstuff from our land. We let them trade in our land. Their livelihood was in good order [...] When there was a drought in your land and you asked us for help, we sent you dates and barley. I know that you are here because you are poor. I will order that your commander receives clothing and a horse with 1,000 dirhams and that each of you receive a load of dates and two sets of clothing so that you leave our land because I don't want to take you prisoner or kill you." But Rabi bin Amir answered: “Allah has sent us to deliver whomsoever chooses, from the worship of men to the worship of Allah, from the narrowness of this world to the vastness of this world and the Hereafter, and from the tyranny and oppression of (false) religions to the justice of Islam.” The emissaries insisted that Persians had to choose between becoming Muslim, paying Jizya or making war. After the negotiations fell through, both sides prepared for battle.

=== Day 1 ===
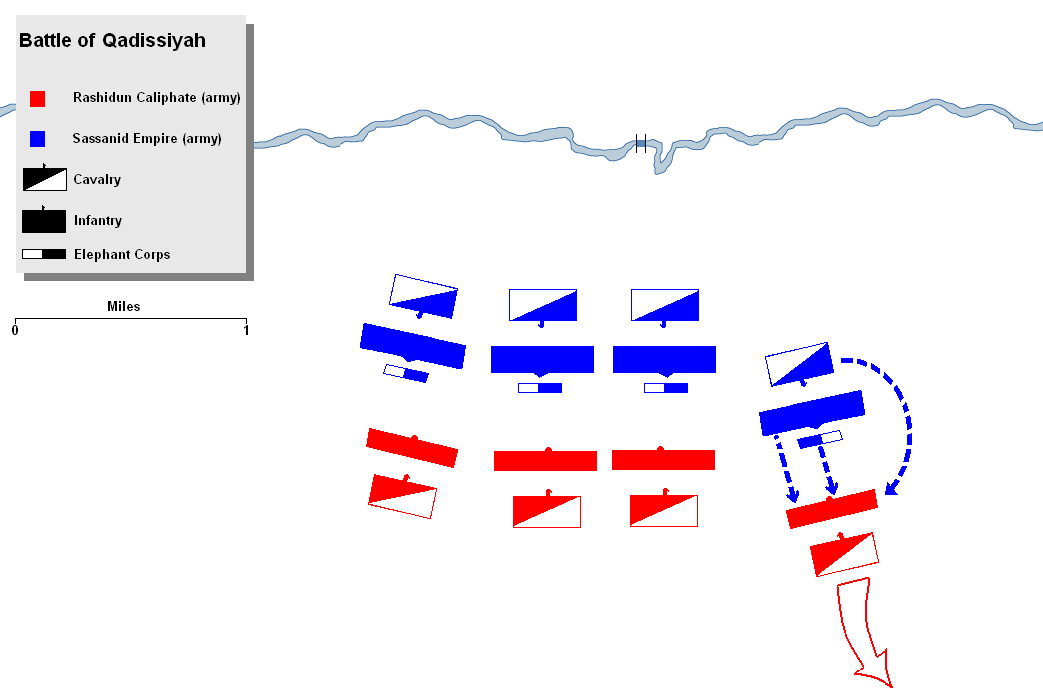
Persian left wing pushed back Muslim's right wing

On 16 November 636, an intervening canal was choked up and converted into a road on Rustam's orders and before dawn, the entire Persian army crossed the canal. Rustam now armed himself with a double set of complete armour and requisite weapons. Both armies stood face to face about 500 meters apart. The Rashidun army was deployed facing northeast, while the Sasanian army was deployed facing southwest and had the river at its rear. Just before the battle started, Sa'd sought to encourage the soldiers: "This is your heritage, promised to you by your God."

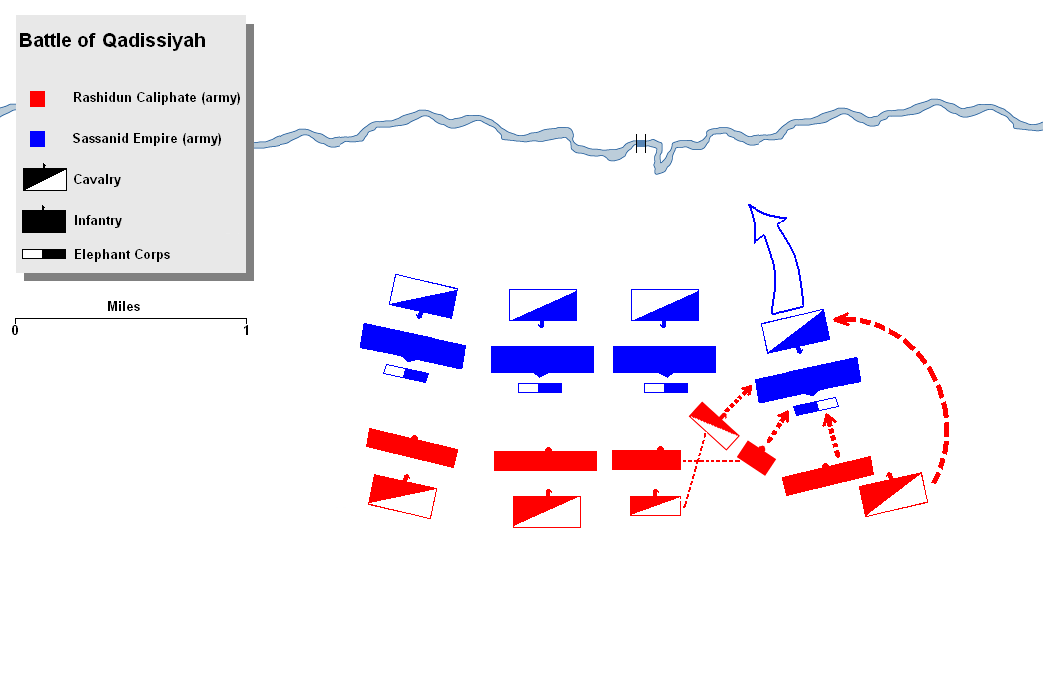
A cavalry and infantry regiments from Muslim's right centre reinforce Muslim's right-wing and fight off Persian's left wing

The battle began with personal duels; Muslim Mubarizun stepped forward and many were slain on both sides. Muslim chronicles record several heroic duels between the Sasanian and Muslim champions. The purpose of these duels was to lower the morale of the opposing army by killing as many champions as possible. Having lost several in duels, Rustam began the battle by ordering his left wing to attack the Muslims' right wing.

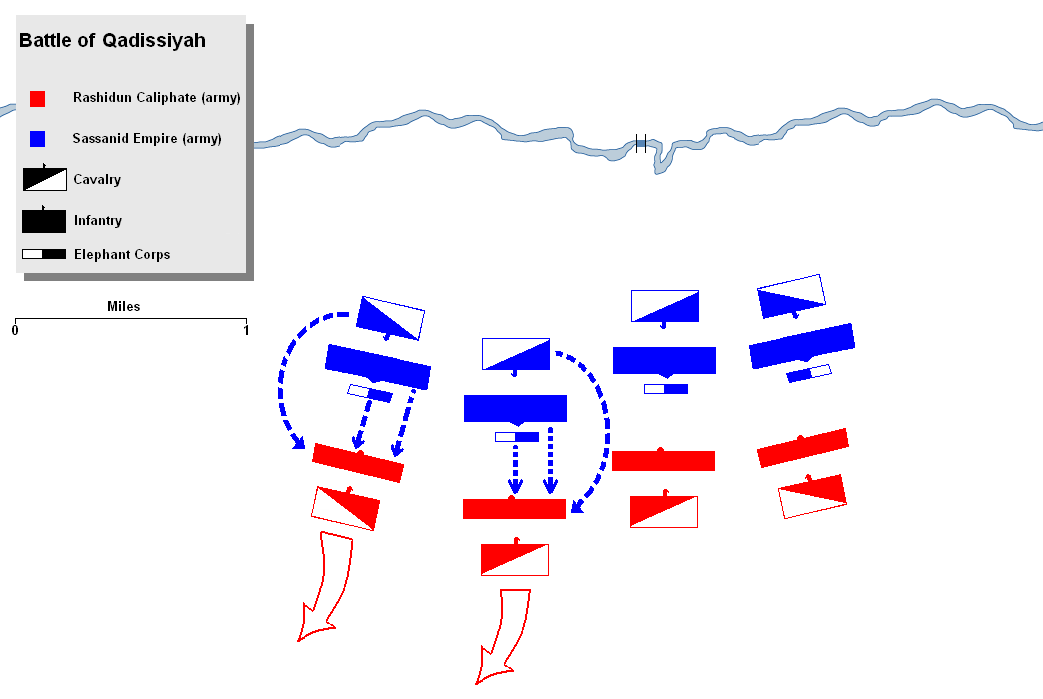
Persians right wing and right centre attacks and drove back Muslim's respective corps

The Persian attack began with heavy showers of arrows, which caused considerable damage to the Muslims' right wing. Elephants led the charge from the Persian side. Abdullah ibn Al-Mutim, the Muslim commander of the right-wing, ordered Jareer ibn Abdullah (cavalry commander of the right-wing) to deal with the Sasanian elephants. However, Jareer's cavalry was stopped by the Sasanian heavy cavalry. The elephants continued to advance, and the Muslim infantry began to fall back.

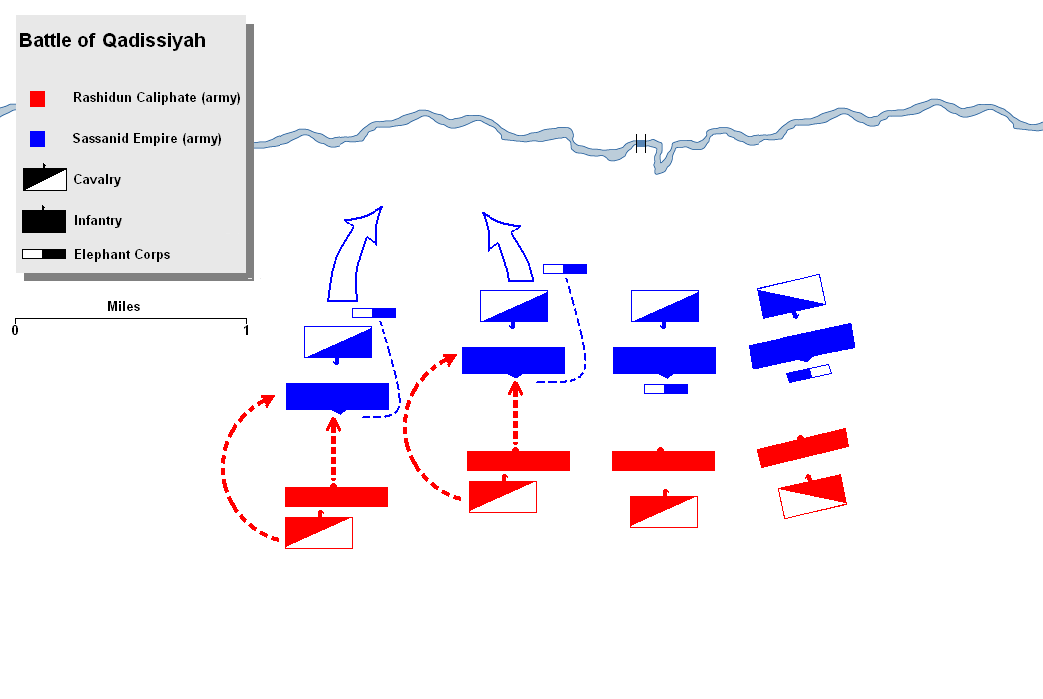
Muslims succeed in routing the Sasanian elephants, following with a two-prong attack on the Persian right wing and right centre, with cavalry attacks on the flank and infantry from the rear

Saad sent orders to Al-Ash'ath ibn Qays, commander of the centre-right cavalry to check the Sasanian cavalry advance. Al-Ash'ath then led a cavalry regiment that reinforced the right wing cavalry and launched a counterattack at the flank of the Sasanian left wing. Meanwhile, Sa'd sent orders to Zuhra ibn Al-Hawiyya, commander of the Muslim right centre, to dispatch an infantry regiment to reinforce the infantry of the right wing. An infantry regiment was sent under Hammal ibn Malik that helped the right-wing infantry launch a counterattack against the Sasanians. The Sasanian left wing retreated under the frontal attack by the infantry of the Muslims' right-wing reinforced by infantry regiments from the right centre and a flanking attack by the Muslim cavalry reinforced by a cavalry regiment from the right centre.

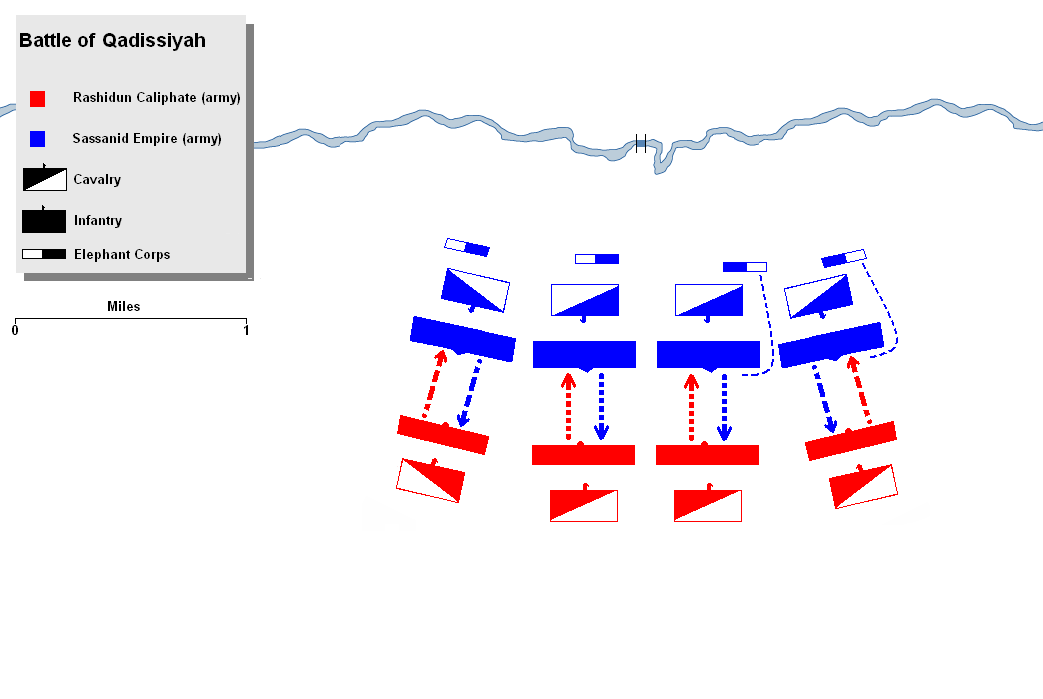
Muslims general attack on the Persian front

With his initial attacks repulsed, Rustam ordered his right centre and right-wing to advance against the Muslim cavalry. The Muslim left wing and left centre were first subjected to intense archery, followed by a charge of the Sasanian right wing and right centre. Once again, the Elephant corps led the charge. The Muslim cavalry on the left wing and left centre, already in panic due to the charge of the elephants, were driven back by the combined charge of the Sasanian heavy cavalry and the elephants.

Sa'd sent word to Asim ibn 'Amr, commander of the left centre, to overpower the elephants. Asim's strategy was to overcome the archers on the elephants and cut the girths of the saddles. Asim ordered his archers to kill the men on elephants and ordered the infantry to cut the girths of the saddles. The tactic worked, and as the Persians retired the elephants, the Muslims counterattacked. The Sasanian army's centre right retreated followed by the retreat of the entire right wing. By afternoon, the Persian attacks on the Muslim left wing and left centre were also beaten back. Saad, in order to exploit this opportunity, ordered yet another counterattack. The Muslim cavalry then charged from the flanks with full force, a tactic known as Karr wa farr. The Muslim attacks were eventually repulsed by Rustam, who plunged into the fray personally and is said to have received several wounds. The fighting ended at dusk. The battle was inconclusive, with considerable losses on both sides.

In the Muslim chronicles, the first day of the battle of Qadisiyyah is known as Yawm al-Armath (يوم أرماث) or "The Day of Disorder".

=== Day 2 ===
On 17 November, like the previous day, Sa'd decided to start the day with the Mubarizuns to inflict maximum morale damage on the Persians. At noon, while these duels were still going on, reinforcements from Syria arrived for the Muslim army. First, an advance guard under Al-Qaqa ibn Amr al-Tamimi arrived, followed by the main army under its commander Hashim ibn Utbah, nephew of Sa'd. Qa’qa divided his advance guard into several small groups and instructed them to reach the battlefield one after the other, giving the impression that a very large contingent of reinforcements had arrived. This strategy had a very demoralizing effect on the Persian army.

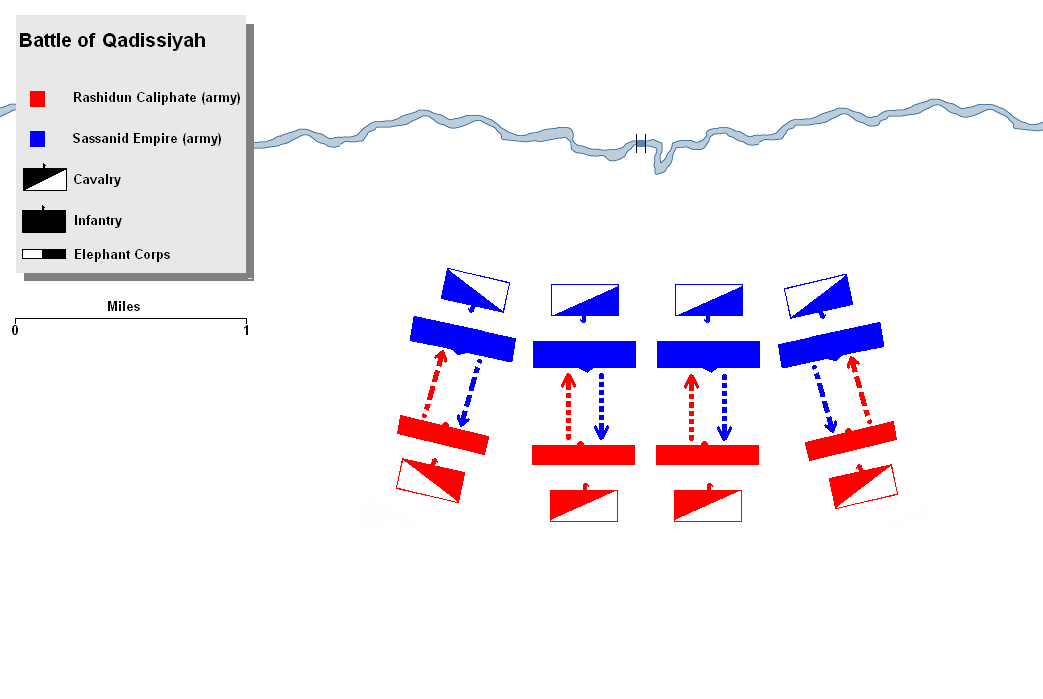
Rustam ordered a general attack on the Muslim front

On this day, Qa’qa is said to have killed the Persian general Bahman Jaduya, who had earlier commanded the Sasanian army at the Battle of Bridge. As there were no elephants in the Sasanian fighting force that day, Sa'd sought to exploit this opportunity to gain any breakthrough if possible, so he ordered a general attack. All four Muslim corps surged forward, but the Sasanians stood firm and repulsed repeated attacks. During these charges, Qa’qa resorted to the ingenious device of camouflaging camels to look like strange monsters. These monsters moved to the Sasanian front; seeing them, the Sasanian horses turned and bolted. The disorganization of the Sasanian cavalry left their left center infantry vulnerable. Sa'd ordered the Muslims to intensify the attack. Qa’qa ibn Amr, now acting as the field commander of the Muslim army, planned to kill Rustam and led a group of Mubarizuns, from his Syrian contingent who were also veterans of the Battle of Yarmouk, through the Sasanians' right centre towards Rustam's headquarters. Rustam once again personally led a counterattack against the Muslims, but no breakthrough could be achieved. At dusk, the two armies pulled back to their camps.

=== Day 3 ===
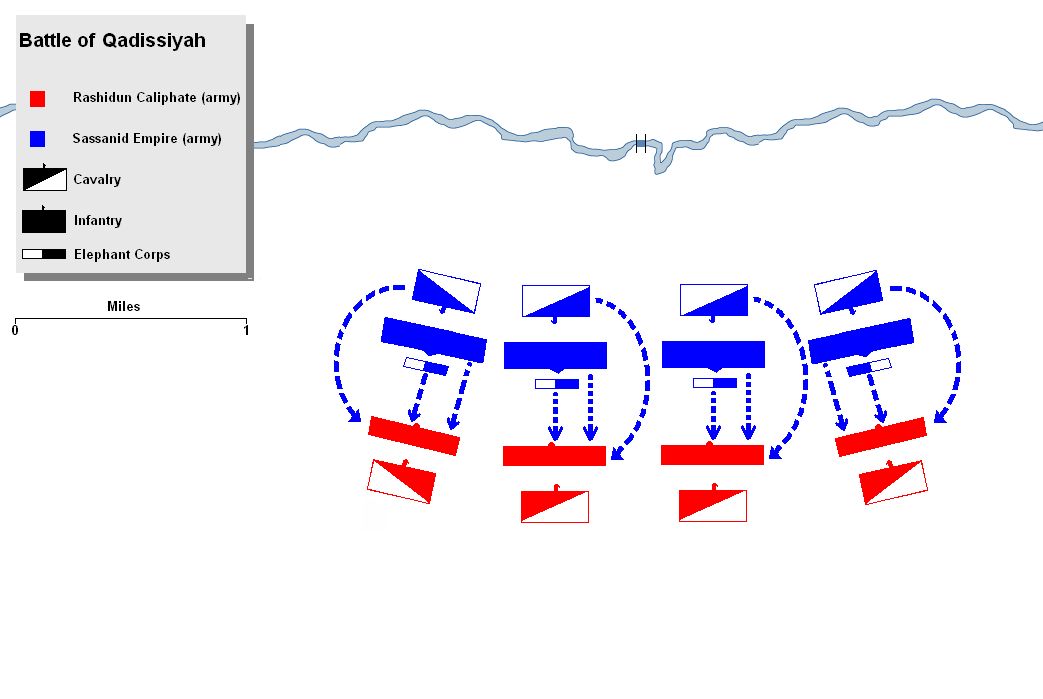
Persians attack Muslims using elephant corps

On 18 November, Rustam wanted a quick victory, before more Muslim reinforcements could arrive. The Elephant corps was once again in front of the Sasanian army, giving him the advantage. Pressing this advantage, Rustam ordered a general attack along the Muslim front, using his entire force. All four Sasanian corps moved forward and struck the Muslims on their front. The Persian attack began with the customary volley of arrows and projectiles. The Muslims sustained heavy losses before their archers retaliated. The Persian elephant corps once again led the charge, supported by their infantry and cavalry. At the approach of the Sasanian elephants, the Muslim riders once again became unnerved, leading to confusion in the Muslim ranks. The Sasanians pressed the attack, and the Muslims fell back.

Through the gaps that had appeared in the foe's ranks because of the Sasanian advance, Rustam sent a cavalry regiment to capture the old palace where Sa'ad was stationed. Rustam's strategy was that the Muslim Commander-in-Chief had to be killed or taken captive to demoralize the Muslims. However, a strong cavalry contingent of Muslims rushed to the spot and drove away the Sasanian cavalry.

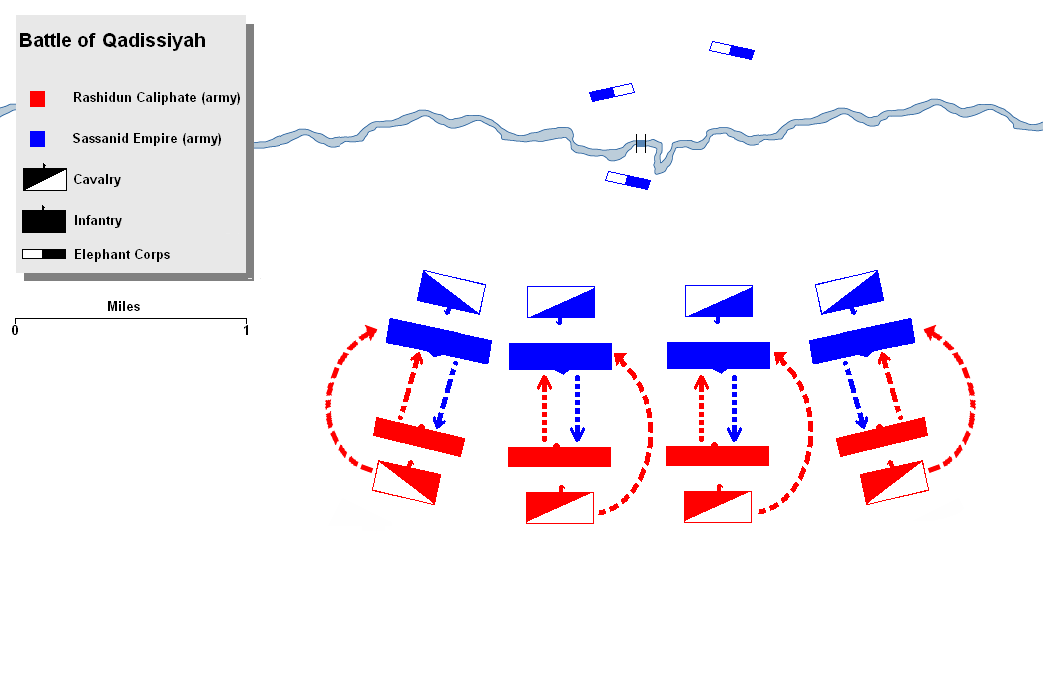
Persian attack beaten back, with elephants driven off the field for good

Sa'd determined that there was only one way to win the battle; to destroy the Sasanian elephant corps that was causing great havoc among the Muslim ranks. He issued orders that the elephants should be overpowered by blinding them and severing their trunks. After a long struggle, the Muslims finally succeeded in mutilating the elephants sufficiently to be driven off. The frightened elephant corps rushed through the Sasanian ranks and made for the river. By noon no elephants were left on the battlefield. The flight of the elephants caused considerable confusion in the Sasanian ranks. To exploit this situation even further, Sa'd ordered a general attack, and the two armies clashed once again. Despite the Muslims' repeated charges, the Sasanians held their ground. In the absence of the Persian elephants, the Muslims once again brought up camels camouflaged as monsters. The trick did not work this time, and the Persian horses stood their ground.

The third day of the battle was the hardest for both armies. There were heavy casualties on both sides, and the battlefield was strewn with the dead bodies of fallen warriors. Despite the fatigue after three days of battle, the armies continued the fight, which raged through the night and ended at dawn. It became a battle of stamina, with both sides on the verge of breaking. Sa'd's strategy was to wear down the Persians and snatch victory from them. In the Muslim chronicles, the third day of the battle is known as Yaum-ul-Amas and the night as Lailat-ul-Harir, meaning the "Night of Rumbling Noises".

=== Day 4 ===
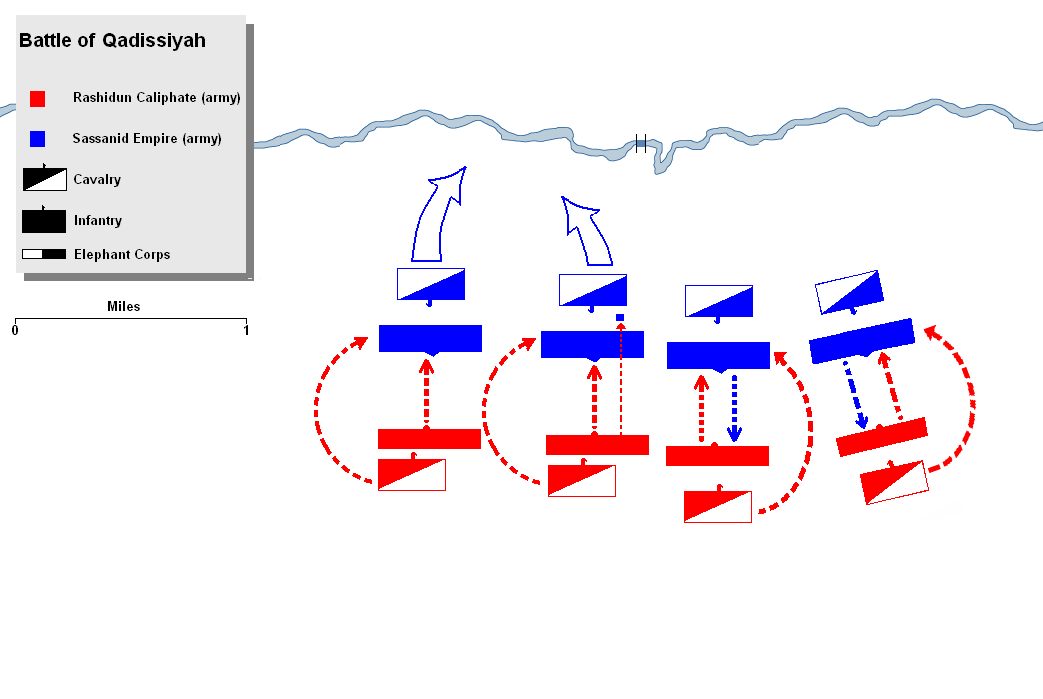
Muslims attack the Persian front, Qa'qa's men penetrated the right centre of the Persian army and killed Rustam

At sunrise of 19 November 636, the fighting had ceased, but the battle was still inconclusive. Qa'qa, with the consent of Sa'd, was now acting as the field commander of the Muslim troops. He is reported to have addressed his men as follows:

"If we fight for an hour or so more, the enemy will be defeated. So, warriors of Bani Tameem make one more attempt and victory will be yours."

The Muslims' left centre led by Qa’qa surged forward and attacked the Sasanian right centre, followed by the general attack of the Muslim corps. The Sasanians were taken by surprise at the resumption of battle. The Sasanian left wing and left centre were pushed back. Qa’qa again led a group of Mubarizuns against the Sasanians' left centre and by noon, he and his men were able to pierce through the Sasanian centre. However, they were unable to break the Persian army.

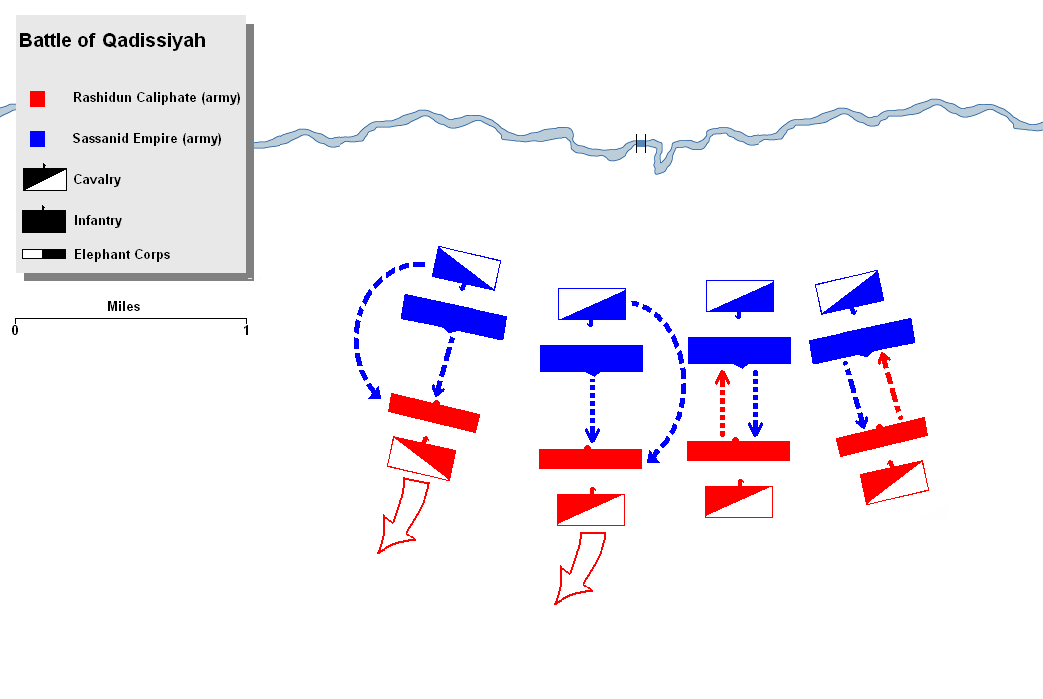
Muslim attacks were beaten back by the Persians right wing and right centre

=== Fall of al-Qadisiyyah ===
On the final day, Rustam was slain, which heralded the defeat of the Persians. Multiple different accounts have been told of his mysterious death:

1. Qa'qa and his men dashed toward the Sasanian headquarters. Meanwhile, in the middle of a sandstorm, Rustam was found dead with over 5 wounds on his body. The Persians were not aware of his death, though, and continued to fight. The Sasanian right wing counter-attacked and regained its lost position, and the Muslims' left wing retreated to its original position. The Muslims' left centre, now under Qa’qa's command, when denied the support of their left wing, also retreated to its original position. Sa'd now ordered a general attack on the Sasanian front to drive away the Persians, who were demoralized by the death of their charismatic leader. In the afternoon, the Muslims mounted another attack.
2. There was a heavy sandstorm facing the Persian army on the final day of the battle. Rustam lay next to a camel to shelter himself from the storm, while some weapons, such as axes, maces, and swords had been loaded on the camel. Hilāl ibn 'Ullafah accidentally cut the girdle of the load on the camel, not knowing that Rustam was behind and under it. The weapons fell on Rustam and broke his back leaving him half-dead and paralyzed. Hilal beheaded Rustam and shouted, "I swear by the god of Kaaba that I have killed Rustam." Shocked by the head of their legendary leader dangling before their eyes, the Persians were demoralized, and the commanders lost control of the army. Many Persian soldiers were slain in the chaos, many escaped through the river, and finally, the rest of the army surrendered. This account has been dismissed as unlikely due to several problems with the story, including the presence of suspicious literary devices and general inconsistencies in the narrative.
3. A version from Ya'qubi records that Dhiraar bin Al-Azwar, Tulayha, Amru bin Ma'adi Yakrib, and Kurt bin Jammah al-Abdi discovered the corpse of Rustam.
4. Yet another version states that Rustam was killed during single combat with Sa'd during which the former was slain while temporarily blinded by the sandstorm. However, like the Al-Tabari, is likely an invention of later story-tellers.

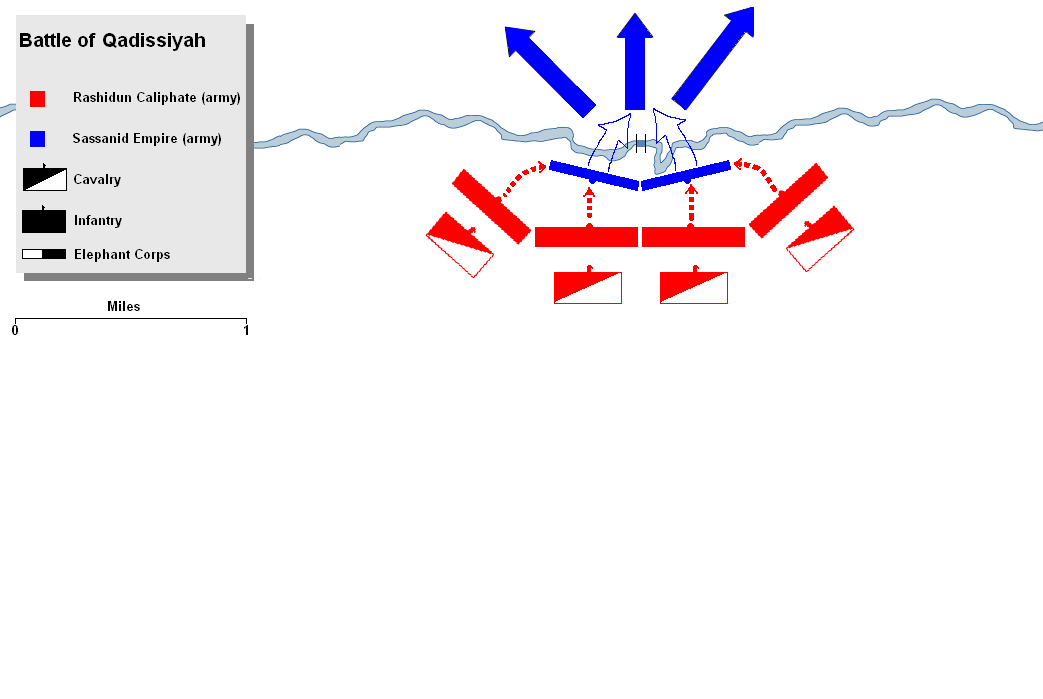
Persians retreating across the river

The Sasanian front, after putting up a last stand, finally collapsed; part of the Sasanian army retreated in an organized manner while the rest retreated in panic towards the river. At this stage Jalinus took command of what was left of the Sasanian army and claimed control of the bridgehead, succeeding in getting the bulk of the army across the bridge safely. The battle of al-Qadisiyyah was over, and the Muslims were victorious. Sa'd sent the cavalry regiments in various directions to pursue the fleeing Persians. The stragglers that the Muslim cavalry met along the way were either killed or taken captive. Heavy casualties were suffered by the Sasanians during these pursuits.

== Aftermath ==
From this battle, the Arab Muslims gained a large number of spoils, including the famed jewel-encrusted royal standard, called the Darafsh-i Kāwiyān (the 'flag of Kāwa'). The jewel was cut up and sold in pieces in Medina. The Arab fighters became known as 'Ahl al-Qādisiyyah', or "Ahl al-Qawadis", and held the highest prestige among later Arab settlers within Iraq and its important garrison town, Kufa.

Once the battle of Qadisiyya was over, Sa'd sent a report of the Muslim victory to Umar. The battle shook Sasanian rule in Iraq to its foundations but was not the end of their rule in Mesopotamia. As long as the Sasanians held their capital Ctesiphon, there was always the danger that at some suitable moment they would attempt to recover what they had lost and drive away the Muslims from Mesopotamia. Caliph Umar thus sent instructions to Saad that as a sequel to the battle of Qadisiyyah, the Muslims should push forward to capture Ctesiphon. The Siege of Ctesiphon continued for two months, and the city was finally taken in March 637. Muslim forces conquered the Persian provinces up to Khuzistan. The conquest was slowed, however, by a severe drought in Arabia in 638 and the plague of Imwas in southern Mesopotamia and the Levant in 639. After this, Caliph Umar wanted a break to manage the conquered territories and for then he wanted to leave the rest of Persia to the Persians. Umar is reported to have said:

"I wish there were a mountain of fire between us and the Persians, so that neither they could get to us, nor we to them."

The Persian perspective, however, was the polar opposite: one of great embarrassment, humiliation, and scorn. The pride of the imperial Sasanians had been hurt by the conquest of Iraq by the Arabs, and the Sasanians continued the struggle to regain the lost territory. Thus, a major Persian counterattack was launched and repulsed at the Battle of Nahavand, fought in December 641.

After that, a full-scale invasion of the Sasanian Empire was planned by Umar to conquer his arch-rival entirely. The last Persian emperor was Yazdgerd III, who was killed in 651 during the reign of the Caliph Uthman. His death marked the end of the Sasanian royal lineage and empire.

== Sources ==
- Akram, A. I. (1970). The Sword of Allah: Khalid bin al-Waleed, His Life and Campaigns. Nat. Publishing House. Rawalpindi. ISBN 0-7101-0104-X.
- Crawford, Peter (2013). The War of the Three Gods: Romans, Persians and the Rise of Islam. Pen and Sword.
- Daryaee, Touraj (2014). Sasanian Persia: The Rise and Fall of an Empire. I.B. Tauris. pp. 1–240. ISBN 978-0857716668.
- Djaït, Hichem (1976). "Les Yamanites à Kūfa au ier siècle de l'Hégire". Journal of the Economic and Social History of the Orient (in French). 19 (2): 151–152.
- Dupuy, Trevor N; Dupuy, R. Ernest (1996). "634–637. Operations in Persia". The Harper Encyclopedia of Military History. HarperCollins.
- Hitti, Phillip Khuri (2005). The Origins of the Islamic State. p. 415.
- Inlow, E. Burke (1979). Shahanshah: A Study of Monarchy of Iran. Motilal Banarsidass.
- Lewental, D. Gershon (2014). "Qadesiya, Battle of". Encyclopædia Iranica.
- Lewental, D. (2016). Rostam b. Farroḵ-Hormozd.
- Morony, M. (1986). "Arab ii. Arab conquest of Iran". Encyclopaedia Iranica.
- Pourshariati, Parvenah (2011). Decline and Fall of the Sasanian Empire. I.B. Tauris.
- Shahbazi, A. Shapur (2005). "Sasanian Dynasty". Encyclopædia Iranica.
- Laffin, John (1986). Brassey's Dictionary of Battles. Barnes & Noble. ISBN 0760707677.
- Alshareef, Muhammad (November 2005). Conquest: History of the Khulafa (Lecture). AlMaghrib Institute - University of Toronto, Toronto.
