= Siege of Ctesiphon (637) =

Part of the Muslim conquest of Persia

- Part of the Muslim conquest of Persia
Date	January–March 637
Location	Ctesiphon, Sasanian Empire 33°5′37″N 44°34′50″E
Result	Rashidun victory
Territorial changes	Annexation of Mesopotamia by the Rashidun Caliphate

Belligerents
Rashidun Caliphate	Sasanian Empire

Commanders and leaders
Sa'd ibn Abi Waqqas; Hashim ibn Utba; Khalid ibn Urfuta; Al-Qa'qa' ibn Amr al-Tamimi; Asim ibn Amr al-Tamimi; Shurahbil ibn Simt; Salman al-Farisi; Zuhra ibn al-Hawiyya (WIA) (Note: Some sources indicate that Zuhra ibn Al-Hawiyya managed to live after the siege, then to be killed in a battle fighting for the Umayyad Caliphate against a revolt led by Shabib ibn Yazid al-Shaybani.)	Yazdegerd III; Farrukhzad; Juansher; Mihran Razi

Units involved
Rashidun army	Sasanian army

Strength
Unknown	Unknown

Casualties and losses
Unknown	Unknown
- Location within modern-day Iraq

The siege of Ctesiphon took place from January to March 637, shortly after the Rashidun Caliphate defeated the Sasanian Empire in the Battle of al-Qadisiyyah. As it had served as the Persian capital city since the Parthian period, the Rashidun victory at Ctesiphon was one of the most significant events of the Muslim conquest of Persia; Muslim rule was consolidated over all of Mesopotamia. The victory of the Rashidun army during this siege also set the stage for further Muslim invasions of the Persian mainland, where the Sasanian army found itself confined.

== Prelude ==
After a Muslim victory in the Battle of al-Qādisiyyah, the Caliph Umar ruled that it was time to conquer the Sasanian Empire's capital of Ctesiphon. He knew that as long as the Persians kept control of their main city, they would retain the possibility, sooner or later, of arranging a counterattack. Umar then ordered Sa`d ibn Abī Waqqās, commander of the Islamic forces in Iraq, to march on Ctesiphon.

In December 636, Sa'd marched to Ctesiphon with a caliphate army of 15,000 soldiers. The Sasanian Emperor Yazdegerd III, fearing an invasion, acted quickly when he received news from his intelligence. He then deployed detachments of troops in the city and along the road leading to Ctesiphon to slow the enemy advance and gain enough time to set up the necessary defenses. When Sa'd learned of the Sasanian detachments on the main road leading to Ctesiphon, he decided to increase the mobility of his army; thus, Sa'd divided the rest of his army into four bodies, under the command of 'Abd Allāh bin Muṭ'im, Shuraḥbīl bin al-Simṭ, Hashim ibn Utba and Khālid bin 'Urfuṭa. Sa'd positioned himself in the second body.

Zuhra ibn al-Hawiyya al-Tamimi assumed the guidance of the avant-garde, composed only of the cavalry, and received orders to move quickly against the main defensive positions of the enemy along the road to Ctesiphon. There he had arrangements to deal with many Sasanian detachments and, if his forces encountered any significant concentration of the Sasanian army, he had to wait until he was aided by the bulk of the Muslim army.

Zuhra's military body left in advance and occupied Najaf, where he expected the rest of the troops to join him. Then he crossed the Euphrates and proceeded along the road to Ctesiphon. He waited in Burs, after the victorious Battle of Burs, at the right bank of the Euphrates, for the bulk of the Muslim troops to reach him. The next step was Babylon, on the opposite bank of the Euphrates, a fortified city where it was known there was a large concentration of Sasanian forces. The Battle of Babylon was strategically important and the access key for Sawad, the territory between the Tigris and the Euphrates.

By mid-December of 636, Muslims gained the Euphrates and camped outside Babylon. The Sasanian forces in Babylon are said to have been commanded by Piruz Khosrow, Hormuzan, Mihran Razi and Nakhiragan. Whatever the reason, it is a fact that the Sasanians were unable to pose a significant resistance to the Muslims. Hormuzan withdrew with his forces to his province of Khuzistan, after which the other Persian generals returned their units and retreated to the north.

After the withdrawal of Sasanian forces, the citizens of Babylon formally surrendered. They were granted protection to the unusual condition of jizya's payment. Some collaborated with the victorious Muslims against the Sasanians and provided valuable information on the disposition of Persian forces. Some Babylon engineers are said to have been employed for the construction of roads and bridges. While the bulk of the Muslims were stationed at Babylon, Zuhra received from Sa'd the order of chasing the Sasanians, who had withdrawn from the city, before they could concentrate somewhere else and pose a new resistance. The Arab-Muslim avant-garde at the command of Zuhra attacked the Persians and struck their backs at Sūrā, breaking into Sasanian and prompting them to withdraw to Deir Ka'b. Zuhra then marched on Deir Ka'b, where he defeated a Sasanian detachment, providing protection to the people under the same conditions accorded to the inhabitants of Babylon.

At the beginning of January 637, the Muslim avant-garde of Zuhra reached Kūthā, seventeen kilometers from Ctesiphon, where the Persians made the last attempt to oppose the Arabs. Sassanid detachment had among its members a dehqan, named Shahryār, who was killed in a duel by a Muslim belonging to probably the elite of the Mubarizun.

In the second week of January 637, the Muslim avant-garde reached Sābāṭ (Valashabad), at 7 km. about the Sassanian capital, without finding any Persian garrisons, even though it normally stays there. The population was afforded protection under the same conditions as paying jizya. The Muslims then occupied the whole area to the door of Ctesiphon.

== Siege of Bahurasir ==
Location of Bahurasīr (Veh-Ardashir/Seleucia) on the west bank of Tigris.

The city of Ctesiphon was the result of two different urban centers, so much so that the Arabs called it "al-Madā'in" or the cities. The main was on the eastern shore of the Tigris, while the western part was known as Bahurasīr (Veh-Ardashir/Seleucia).

The Muslim advance on Ctesiphon was postponed due to the detachment on the road to the capital. This gave Yazdegerd III enough time to prepare for a city defense. It was expected that the Muslims would follow the traditional road to Ctesiphon and appear on the side of Bahurasīr. Knowing this, the city prepared well for the defense, preparing a deep trench around the perimeter of the capital. As the Arab avant-garde approached Bahurasīr, the Persian garrison launched large stones and boulders with its ballistic and catapult. The Muslims withdrew outside the range of bullets and laid siege to the city.

The siege began in January 637 and lasted for two months. Bahurasīr was providing supplies to the surrounding countryside, although receiving supplies from Ctesiphon, on the other side of the Tigris. The Muslims began for the first time to carry the siege with the equipment provided to them by the Persian engineers who had accepted the Islamic power.

In March 637, the Sassanian garrison was pulled out of the city in a determined attempt to break the siege. According to reports, the Sassanid forces were led by a lion who had been specially trained for war, who quickly advanced towards the Muslim lines, astonishing the horses, who fled in fear. It is said that Hashim ibn Utba ran towards the animal and gave it a blow so well that he immediately fell dead. Sa'd bin Abī Waqqāṣ advanced the forces and kissed Hāshim on his forehead, in admiration for his unseen act of heroism. Although they do not know who commanded Sassanian forces, Muslim chroniclers say that the Persian commander was killed in duel with Zuhra. Later on, that same evening, Zuhra was injured by an arrow and the hero of the march on Ctesiphon died. He was inundated with all military honors.

After the fighting was stopped, a Persian emissary went to the Muslim camp with a message from Sassanian Shāhanshāh. It is said that the emissary stated:

Our Emperor asks you if you would be in favor of a peace based on the fact that the Tigris function as a demarcation line between you and us, so that what extends to the east of it will remain ours and what is west is yours. If this does not satisfy your country hunger, then nothing can satisfy you.

Sa'd bin Abī Waqqāṣ, however, insisted on the usual conditions of payment of jizya by the surrendered persons or the sword, that is, of the ultimate blood-fighting. The Sasanians chose the sword.

While closing Ctesiphon in their own defense, the Sasanian forces and Bahurasīr residents abandoned most of the city the following day, destroying all the bridges on the Tigris behind them. They removed every boat from the western bank of the river and anchored them on the eastern shore. Ctesiphon was monitored from its southern end to the natural barrier made by the Tigris, while a trench was dug around the rest of the suburbs. With this measure, Yazdegerd alleged that he could resist the Muslims until he could arrange reinforcements from other provinces of the Empire and break the narrow circle from the besiegers. When the Muslims occupied Bahurasīr, the city was empty.

== Fall of Ctesiphon ==
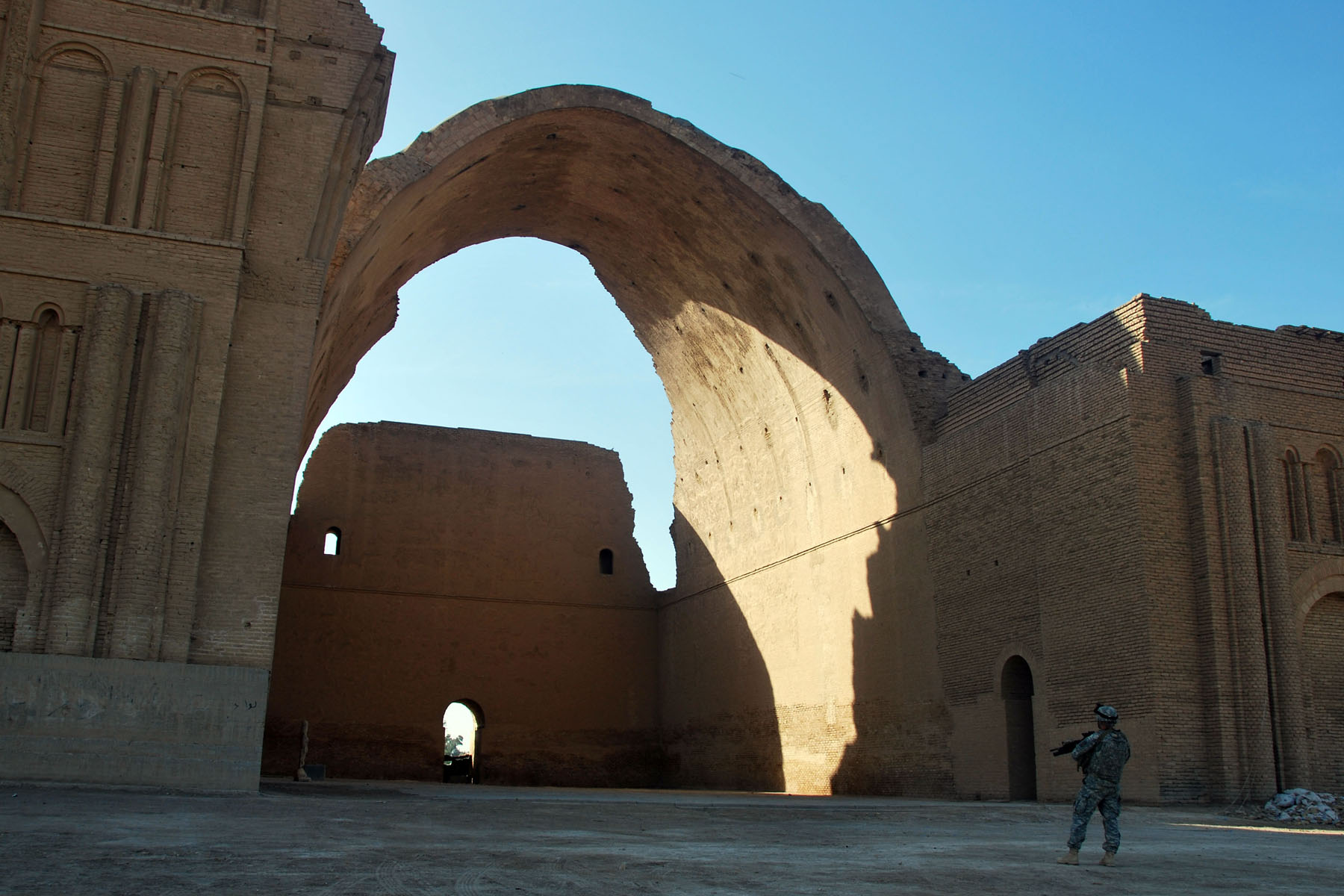
Taq-i Kisra, the ruined arch that is the only existing structure in Ctesiphon, was built by Khosrow I after the Lazic War in 540, which was part of the Persian imperial palace and served as a mosque after the Muslim conquest in 637.

After the occupation of Bahurasīr, only about 750 meters of the width of the Tigris separated the Muslims and Ctesiphon. However, the river was full and there were no boats available for Muslims that would allow them to cross. The Sasanian forces at Ctesiphon were commanded by generals Mihran and Farrukhzad, brother of General Rostam Farrokhzād, killed in the battle of al-Qādisiyyah.

The Persian volunteers who had accepted the power of the Muslims showed Sa'd a downstream site where they could cross the river, but it was not too sure if such a transaction would be possible, given the high water level. The following morning Sa'd asked volunteers to cross the river on horseback. At first a group of six volunteer knights, at the command of Asim ibn 'Amr al-Tamimi entered the river to wade through it. A detachment of Sasanian cavalry was sent to intercept them, thus entering into the waters of the Tigris. In the clash that followed, the Muslims had the best, finally putting foot on the eastern shore. The first group of volunteers was immediately followed by other horse-drawn formations. The infantry was probably also sent on the eastern shore of the Tigris with boats moored on the shore.

The Sasanian forces were too inferior to offer effective resistance to Muslims, and so Ctesiphon fell. Led by Asim ibn 'Amr, Muslim forces entered the Sasanian capital. The columns entered the center of the city without finding any Persian resistance. They reached the White Palace (Taq-i Kisra), home of the Persian government, and occupied it. Ctesiphon fell in the Arab hands without any battle.

== Aftermath ==
After occupying the city, Sa'd bin Abī Waqqāṣ proclaimed an amnesty for every Persian left. A delegation of people's representatives knew the terms of the surrender and had to resign themselves to the usual jizya payment. An act of peace was signed and the citizens were urged to return to their usual occupations. Sa'd moved to the White Palace and established his headquarters. In the great inner courtyard, a mosque was built.

Shāhanshāh Yazdegerd III had, in the meantime, been sheltering at Hulwan, carrying much of the imperial treasure and all that precious he could take. Sa'd then sent armed columns in different directions to intercept Sassanian refugees, after which a huge booty came into the Muslim hands. Although the Muslim forces conquered the Persian provinces, even as far as Khuzistan, their advance was slowed down by a severe drought in Arabia in 638 and by plagues in southern Iraq and in Syria in 639. After these events, the caliph Umar decided to reorganize the territories conquered and decided to stop the offensive.

The Sassanids continued their struggle to regain the lost territories, but their powerful army was defeated in the Battle of Nahavand, fought in December 641. In 651, the last Shāhanshāh, Yazdegerd III, was assassinated at the time of the caliphate Uthman. After Yazdegerd III's death the Sassanian Persian Empire ceased to exist.

== See also ==
- Baharestan Carpet

== Bibliography ==
- Franz Rosenthal, The Muqaddimah: An Introduction to History by Ibn Khaldūn, NJ Dawood, 1967
- Ashtiani, Abbas Iqbal and Pirnia, Hassan. Tarikh-e Iran ( History of Iran ), 3rd ed. Tehran, Kayyam Publishing House, 1973.
- Muḥammad ibn Jarīr al-Ṭabarī, Abū Ja'far Muḥammad. The Battle of al-Qādisiyyah and the conquest of Syria and Palestine. Edited and translated by Yohanan Friedmann. SUNY series in Middle Eastern Studies. Albany, State University of New York Press, 1992.
