= Tiruyah =

Sasanian military commander (died 637)

- Died: April 637; Battle of Jalula, April 637
- Military career
- Allegiance: Sasanian Empire
- Branch: Sasanian army
- Conflicts: Muslim conquest of Persia · Sasanian civil war of 628–632

Tiruyah was a senior commander of the Sasanian Imperial Army who participated in the Battle of al-Qadisiyyah and the Battle of Jalula, where he was eventually killed.

== Life ==
Following the death of Khosrow II, which triggered a series of civil wars in Iran, Tiruyah became a member of the Pahlavi Council, which was in some ways supportive of Yazdegerd III. He fought alongside the Persian army at the Battle of al-Qadisiyyah. After the defeat of the Sasanian army, he returned to Ctesiphon. He later fought against the Arab forces alongside Mihran Razi at the Battle of Jalula, where he was killed.
