= Al-Qa'qa' ibn Amr al-Tamimi =

Arab military commander

Al-Qaʿqāʿ ibn ʿAmr al-Tamimī

Personal details
- Born: Nejd, Arabian Peninsula
- Died: Kufa, Iraq
- Parent: ʿAmr ibn Mālik al-Tamimī

Military service
- Allegiance: Rashidun Caliphate
- Branch/service: Rashidun army
- Rank: General
- Unit: Mobile guard
- Battles/wars: Battle of Chains; Battle of Husayd; Battle of Yarmouk; Battle of al-Qadisiyyah; Siege of Ctesiphon (637); Battle of Jalula

Al-Qaʿqāʿ ibn ʿAmr ibn Mālik Al-Tamīmī (Arabic: القعقاع بن عمرو بن مالك التميمي الراعي) was an Arab Muslim commander and general in the Rashidun army who belonged to the tribe of Banu Tamim. He and his tribe converted to Islam possibly during the time of Ahnaf ibn Qais. He is known as a successful military commander who took part in two important victorious battles in the early Muslim Conquest, the Battle of Yarmouk against the Byzantine Empire (commanded by Khalid ibn al-Walid) and the Battle of al-Qadisiyyah against the Sasanian Empire which was led by Sa`d ibn Abi Waqqas. The Caliph Abu Bakr praised him as an equal to a thousand men so in return the caliph's successor, caliph Umar, only sent Qaʿqāʿ and a handful of bodyguards in the first wave of reinforcements to Al-Qadissiyah.

== Life ==
=== Ridda wars ===
Qa'qa ibn Amr At-tamimi converted along with his tribe, in the Year of the Delegations, 631 CE. But, for a brief period, he and other Tamim joined the force of the false prophetess Sajah bint al-Harith before she was subdued during the Ridda wars. Later on he carried on a successful military campaign under Khalid bin Walid, suppressing another false prophet, Tulayha, in the Battle of Buzakha. After the Ridda wars ended he continued to follow Khalid's campaign to Syria and Iraq.

=== Muslim conquest of Iraq and Syria ===
Qa'qa took part in the Battle of Chains and on one occasion when Qa'qa saw Khalid duelling the Sassanid champion Hormuzan, Qa'qa immediately rushed as he saw Hormuz had sent five to six soldiers to aid him, swarming over Khalid to intercept the duel. Then Qa'qa and Khalid overcame Hormuzan and his guards, killing all the Sassanid soldiers who intended to kill Khalid during the duel in the process, along with Hormuzan. During this battle it is reported that Qa'qa said: "We did trample Hormuz with fury restrained...".

Later, as incensed Christian Arabs of this area sought revenge for their leader Aqqa who fell in the Battle of Al-Anbar, they contacted the Persian commander named Bahman who in turn divided the Persian-Arab forces into two field armies and sent them off from Ctesiphon. The first force under Ruzbeh moved to Husaid, and the other, under Zarmahr, moved to Khanafis. For the moment these two armies were located in separate areas for ease of movement and administration, but they were not to proceed beyond these locations until the Christian Arabs were ready for battle. Bahman planned to concentrate the entire imperial army to either await a Muslim attack or march south to fight the Muslims at Hira.

This situation had been anticipated by Khalid before his arrival at Hira from Dumat Al-Jandal, as he divided the Muslim garrison of Hira into two corps, one of which he placed under Qa'qa' and the other under Abu Laila. Khalid sent them both to Ain-ul-Tamr, where he would join them a little later after the troops who had fought at Dumat Al-Jandal had been rested. The forces of Qa'qa' consisted of two divisions of migratory tribe warriors named "The Righteous"(al-Bararah) and "The Best"(al-Khiyarah), whereas the al-Khiyarah division was led by 'Ismah ibn Abdallah. (Note: al-Bararah and al-Khiyarah came from Tabari narration, whereas translated to 'Righteous' and 'Best' by Blankinship)

As the forces of Qa'qa' met Zarmahr in the Battle of Husayd, while Abu Laila met Ruzbih in Khanafis, Qa'qa' immediately commanded his forces to gallop forward, as per the instruction of Khalid, whenever they met an enemy force on their march. Zarmahr in response immediately asked Ruzbih, who was blocked by the forces of Abu Laila, to aid his forces rather than engaging Abu Laila. Qa'qa' personally slew Zarmahr while Ruzbih in turn was killed by 'Ismah. Thereafter the Muslims charged. As the battle continued, the Persians and their allies started to realize their losses and retreated to Khanafis.

When the Persian garrison at Khanafis came to know of the Persian defeat at Huseid and of the death of their own Commander Zarmahr, Mabhuzab and his forces abandoned Khanafis and with his forces moved to Muzayyah further north, where more forces were available and defenses were stronger. When the Muslim forces under Abu Leila arrived at Khanafis, they found that there were no Persian forces to meet them.

Later, Khalid made a detour to return to his main headquarters to rendezvous with Qa'qa' and Abu Laila, further chasing the Persians and their Arab allies towards Muzayyah. Khalid rode on his camel instead of his horse during his return to Ayn al Tamr.

In the famous battle of Yarmouk under Khalid, Qa'qa' served as Khalid's subordinate officer in the mobile guard elite cavalry, subsequently taking part as 'Fire Brigade' role, plugging all weak points or reinforcing the routed line within the Muslim ranks.

The Caliph Umar ibn al-Khattāb sent Al-Qa'qa' ibn 'Amr to take part in the battle of Qadisiyya. On 17 November 636, his units reached the battlefield at noon. Before arriving, Qa'qa' divided his troops into several smaller groups and instructed them to appear on the battlefield one after the other, giving the impression that large reinforcements were arriving. Qa'qa' was busy raising morale and arranging his companions to the place from where he parted from them the previous day. The Persian army's elephants were a serious obstacle for the Muslims. To solve this problem, Qa'qa' resorted to an ingenious device. The camels in his army were disguised to look like weird monsters. These "monsters" were moved to the Sassanid front and, upon seeing them, the Sassanid horses turned and fled. With the disorganization of the Sassanid cavalry, the Persian infantry at the left and center became exposed and vulnerable. Saad ordered an all-out attack by the Muslims. After the Persian army was routed Qa'qa' ibn Amr went into pursuit and killed the Persian general Bahman, who commanded the Sasanian army at the Battle of the Bridge.

When the battle resumed on 18 November 636, al-Qa'qa' led a vanguard cavalry of three hundred, accompanied by Qays bin Hazim who led the Hashim tribe kinsmen from Syria together with local Iraqi tribal warriors. This time they were involved in melee combat against the Sassanid elephant corps. The Muslim cavalry blinded the elephants and severed their trunks with spears and other melee weapons while the Muslim archers struck down the elephant riders. The situation became dire for the Muslims later on that day, despite having already annihilated the elephant corps, because the Sassanids fought even more ferociously, resulting in al-Qa'qa's fellow kinsmen, Khalid bin Yamar al-Tamimi, being killed during the night. Consequently, al-Qa'qa' was tasked with the initiative of reinvigorating the Muslim army.

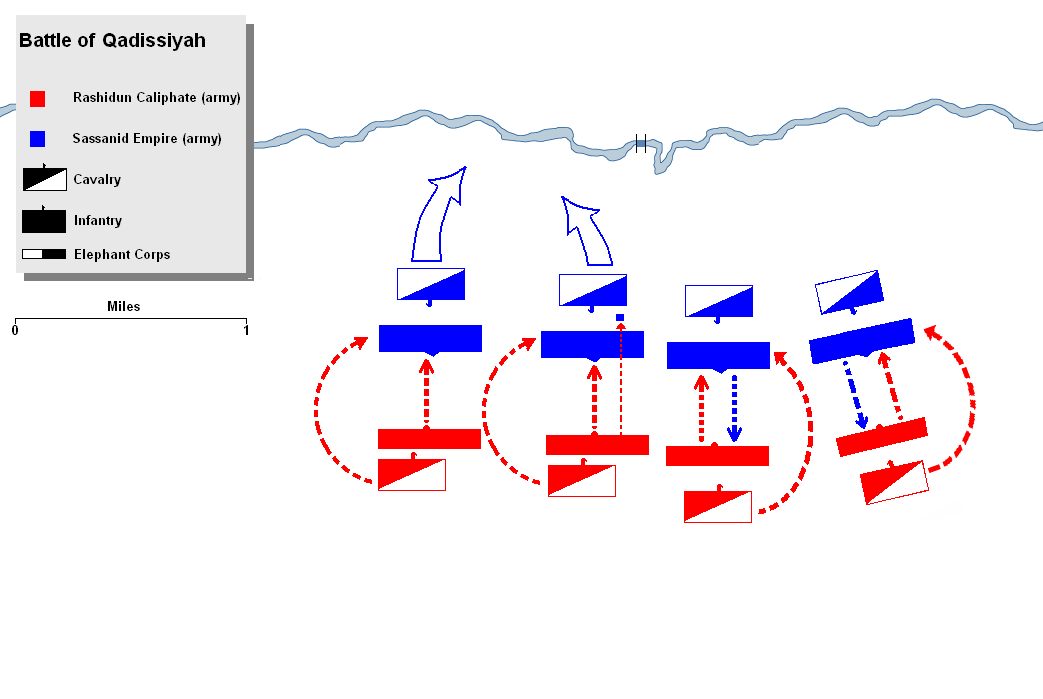
The Muslims attack the Persian front, al-Qa'qa's men penetrated the right center of the Persian army and killed Rustum

At sunrise of 19 November 636, the fighting had ceased, but the battle was still inconclusive. Al-Qa'qa', with the consent of Saad, was now acting as a field commander of the Muslim troops. He is reported to have addressed his men as follows:

"If we fight for an hour or so more, the enemy will be defeated. So, warriors of the Bani Tameem, make one more attempt and victory will be yours."

The Muslims' left center led by al-Qa'qa' surged forward and attacked the Sassanid right center, followed by the general attack of the Muslim corps. The Sassanids were taken by surprise at the resumption of battle. The Sassanids' left wing and left center were pushed back. Al-Qa'qa' again led a group of Mubarizun against the Sassanids' left center and by noon, he and his men were able to pierce through the Sassanid center.

During the Battle of Jalula Mihran engaged his troops in an open battlefield, and Hashim ibn Utbah decided to carry out his maneuver. He dispatched a strong cavalry regiment under one of his most illustrious cavalry commanders, Qa'qa' ibn Amr, to capture the bridge over the entrenchments. The bridge was not heavily guarded as virtually all the Persian troops available were used to assault Muslim army's main rank. Qa'qa' maneuvered around the Persian right flank and quickly captured the bridge at their rear. The news of a strong Muslim cavalry detachment in their rear was a serious setback to Persian morale. Hashim launched a frontal attack with Muslim infantry while Qa'qa' struck at the Persian rear with his cavalry. Thus the Sassanid Army were trapped and routed as a result.

After the campaign in Jalula was ended he stayed and held a military post for a while in Kufa.

==== Defense of Emesa ====
In 638, Emesa was laid in siege by the coalition forces of Arab Christian tribes from Jazira which mustered by Heraclius in an attempt to stymie the losses of Byzantine territories due to rapid expansion of the Rashidun caliphate in the Levant. On the orders of Umar, Sa'd ibn Abi Waqqas immediately sent Qa'qa' with 4,000 soldiers with him to aid the defenders of Emesa which were led by his former superiors during the battle of Yarmouk, Abu Ubaydah and Khalid ibn Walid. Later as the Christian Arab coalitions abandoned the siege, Khalid and Qa'qa' immediately came out of the fort to pursue the enemy and inflicted heavy losses to the fleeing Arab Christian coalition forces.

=== First Muslim civil war ===
During the uprising against the rule of Caliph Uthman, Qa'qa' quickly suppressed the rebellious potential brought by Yazid bin Qays al-Arhabi. Many times he went using his own reputation as the hero of The Caliphate, who was respected and feared by peoples of Kufa, to cool down the heated political atmosphere before and after caliph Uthman was murdered. He even tried to mediate the factions of caliph Ali and Aisha to ensuing peaceful negotiation, although his attempts were fruitless and the Battle of the Camel occurred anyway.

After the civil war was ended he was dismissed by Caliph Muawiyah I together with other Ali supporters from Kufa and exiled to Jerusalem.

== Death ==
Despite the exile he later went back to live in Kufa, where he allegedly died later in retirement.

== See also ==
- Battle of al-Qadisiyyah
- Battle of Yarmouk
- Banu Tamim
- Jarir ibn Atiyah

== Bibliography ==
- Al-Maghlouth, Sami ibn Abd allah ibn Ahmad (2006). Atlas of Caliph Abu Bakr. p. 84.
- Quraibi, Ibrahim (2016). Tarikh Khulafa(history of the caliphs). Qisthi Press. p. 280. ISBN 9789791303408.
- Tabari, Muhammad ibn Jarir; Blankinship, Khalid Yahya (1993). The History of al-Tabari vol. 11 (Khalid Yahya Blankinship ed.). State university of New York press. pp. 61–63.
- Donner, Fred (2014). The Early Islamic Conquests. Princeton University Press. p. 370. ISBN 9781400847877.
