= Baharestan Carpet =

Historical Perisan carpet

The Baharestan Carpet, or Bahār-e Kasrā (Persian: بهار کسری, from Middle Persian Vahār-i Khosrow; meaning "The spring of Khosrow"), also known as Farš-e zamestānī ("Winter carpet"), and Bahārestān ("Spring garden"), was a large, late Sasanian royal carpet, that is now lost, but is known from historical accounts. It most likely covered the floor of the great audience hall of Taq Kasra, an iwan in the Sasanian capital of Ctesiphon.

The carpet was 27m long and 27m wide. Woven of silk, gold, silver, and rare stones, the carpet depicted a splendid garden akin to paradise.

When Ctesiphon fell to the Arabs in 637, the carpet was too heavy for the Iranians to carry away, which resulted in the carpet being seized by the Arabs. Sa'd ibn Abi Waqqas, who led the Arab troops during the capture of Ctesiphon, sent the carpet to the Rashidun caliph Umar, who was in Medina. There the carpet was cut into small fragments and divided among the Arabs. One of the Arabs who received a piece of the carpet was Ali who, although he did not receive the best piece, managed to sell it for 30,000 dirhams.

== See also ==
- Persian carpet

== Sources ==
- Yarshater, Ehsan, ed. (1985–2007). The History of al-Ṭabarī (40 vols). SUNY Series in Near Eastern Studies. Albany, New York: State University of New York Press. ISBN 978-0-7914-7249-1.
- Morony, M. G. (1988). "BAHĀR-E KESRĀ". In Yarshater, Ehsan (ed.). Encyclopædia Iranica. Vol. III/5: Bahai Faith III–Baḵtīārī tribe II. London and New York: Routledge & Kegan Paul. p. 479. ISBN 978-0-71009-117-8.
