= Shahriyar of Derbent =

7th-century Iranian aristocrat

Shahriyar was an Iranian aristocrat, who served as the commander of Kutha, an ancient city close to the Sasanian capital of Ctesiphon.

Born in Derbent to a dehqan family, Shahriyar is first mentioned during the Arab invasion of Iran, where in 637 he was appointed as the commander of Kutha by the two military officers Mihran Razi and Nakhiragan. The two military officers then went to Ctesiphon, while Shahriyar stayed in Kutha.

The Arabs soon arrived to Kutha, and when they reached there, Shahriyar said the following thing to them; "Let any man or rider from among you big and strong enough come forward to me in order that i may teach him a lesson." The Arab general Zuhra ibn al-Hawiyya then insulted Shahriyar, which made him attack the Arab army; however, Shahriyar was eventually defeated and killed during the clash.

== Sources ==
- Morony, Michael G. (2005) [1984]. Iraq After The Muslim Conquest. Gorgias Press LLC. ISBN 978-1-59333-315-7.
- Al-Tabari, Abu Ja'far Muhammad ibn Jarir (1989). Yar-Shater, Ehsan (ed.). The History of al-Tabari Vol. 13: The Conquest of Iraq, Southwestern Persia, and Egypt: The Middle Years of 'Umar's Caliphate A.D. 636-642/A.H. 15-21. Trans. G. H. A. Juynboll. Albany, NY: State University of New York Press. ISBN 0887068766.
- Minorsky, Vladimir (1958). A History of Sharvān and Darband in the 10th-11th Centuries. Cambridge: W. Heffer and Sons. OCLC 5042566.
