= Battle of Husayd =

Muslim conquest of Persia (c. 633)

- Part of Muslim conquest of Persia and Campaigns of Khalid ibn al-Walid
Date	633 AD
Location	Husayd, west of Baghdad, south-east of Ayn al-Tamr
Result	Rashidun victory

Belligerents
Rashidun Caliphate	Sasanian Empire

Commanders and leaders
Al-Qa'qa' ibn Amr al-Tamimi 'Ismah ibn Abdallah	Zarmahr †; Ruzbih †

Casualties and losses
Unknown	Heavy

The Battle of Husayd took place between Rashidun caliphate army under Al-Qa'qa' ibn Amr al-Tamimi against the warriors of Arab Christian and Sasanian army of 633 AD. Rashidun army defeated the coalition army in decisive battle and all the coalition commanders involved in this battle has fallen.

== Background ==
The incensed Christian Arabs of this area were seeking revenge for their leader Aqqa who had fallen in the Battle of Al-Anbar. In response, they contacted the Persian commander named Bahman who in turn divided the Persian-Arab forces into two field armies and sent them off from Ctesiphon. The first force under Ruzbih moved to Husaid, and the other, under Zarmahr, moved to Khanafis. For the moment these two armies were located in separate areas for ease of movement and administration, but they were not to proceed beyond these locations until the Christian Arabs were ready for battle. Bahman planned to concentrate the entire imperial army to either await a Muslim attack or march south to fight the Muslims at Hira.

This situation had been anticipated by Khalid before his arrival at Hira from Dumat Al-Jandal as he divided the Muslim garrison of Hira into two corps, one of which he placed under Qaqa and the other under Abu Laila. Khalid sent them both to Ain-ul-Tamr, where he would join them a little later after the troops who had fought at Dumat Al-Jandal had been rested. The forces of Qa'qa consisted of two divisions of migrator tribe warriors that named "The Righteous"(al-Bararah) and "The Best"(al-Khiyarah), whereas the al-Khiyarah division was led by 'Ismah ibn Abdallah. (Note: al-Bararah and al-Khiyarah came from Tabari narration, whereas translated to 'Righteous' and 'Best' by Blankinship)

== Battle ==
As the forces of Qa'qa' has met Zarmahr in Husayd, while Abu Laila met Ruzbih in Khanafis, Qa'qa' immediately commanded his forces to gallop forward as per instruction of Khalid before whenever he meets an enemy force on his ways. Zarmahr in response immediately asked Ruzbih, who is blocked by the forces of Abu laila, to aid his forces instead rather than engaging Abu Laila. Qa'qa' personally slew Zarmahr while Ruzbih was in turn killed by 'Ismah. Thereafter the Muslims charged. The Persians and their allies started to realize their losses and retreated to Khanafis.

== Aftermath ==
When the Persian garrison at Khanafis learned of the Persian defeat at Huseid and of the death of their Commander Zarmahr, Mabhuzab and his forces abandoned Khanafis and with his forces moved to Muzayyah further north where more forces were available and defenses were stronger. When the Muslim forces under Abu Leila arrived at Khanafis, they found that there were no Persian forces to meet them.

Khalid, however, was not happy with the operations for the entire Persian garrison at Khanafis had escaped slaughter at the hands of the Muslims. So he made a detour to return to his main headquarters to rendezvous with Qa'qa' and Abu Laila further chasing the Persians and their Arab allies towards Muzayyah. Khalid rode his camel instead of the horse during his return to Ayn al Tamr.

== Bibliography ==
- Al-Maghlouth, Sami ibn Abd allah ibn Ahmad (2006). Atlas of Caliph Abu Bakr. p. 84.
- Quraibi, Ibrahim (2016). Tarikh Khulafa(history of the caliphs). Qisthi Press. p. 280. ISBN 9789791303408.
- Tabari, Muhammad ibn Jarir; Blankinship, Khalid Yahya (1993). The History of al-Tabari vol. 11 (Khalid Yahya Blankinship ed.). State university of New York press. pp. 61–63.
- Donner, Fred (2014). The Early Islamic Conquests. p. 370. ISBN 9781400847877.
