= Battle of Jalula =

Battle between Caliphate and Sassanids in 637

Coordinates: 34.2833°N 45.1667°E

- Part of the Muslim conquest of Persia
Date	April 637
Location	Jalawla, Iraq
Result	Rashidun victory
Territorial changes	Territory west of Zagros Mountains annexed by Rashidun Caliphate.

Belligerents
Sasanian Empire	Rashidun Caliphate

Commanders and leaders
Farrukhzad; Mihran Razi †; Piruz Khosrow; Varaztirots; Hormuzan; Tiruyah †	Hashim ibn Utba; Al-Qa'qa' ibn Amr; Tulayha ibn Khuwaylid; Amr ibn Ma'adi Yakrib

Units involved
Sasanian army	Rashidun army

Strength
20,000	12,000

Casualties and losses
Heavy	Heavy

The Battle of Jalula was fought between the Sasanian Empire and the Rashidun Caliphate soon after the conquest of Ctesiphon by the latter.

After Ctesiphon fell following a siege, several detachments of the Muslim army were immediately sent to the west to capture Qarqeesia and Heet, the forts at the border of the Byzantine Empire. Several strong Persian armies were still active north-east of Ctesiphon at Jalula and north of the Tigris at Tikrit and Mosul. The greatest threat of all was the Persian concentration at Jalula. After withdrawal from Ctesiphon, the Persian armies gathered at Jalula north-east of Ctesiphon, a place of strategic importance from where routes led to Iraq, Khurasan and Azerbaijan. The Persian forces at Jalula were commanded by General Mihran. His deputy was General Farrukhzad, a brother of General Rostam Farrokhzād, who had commanded the Persian forces at the Battle of Qadisiyyah. As instructed by the Caliph Umar, Sa'd ibn Abi Waqqas reported everything to Umar. The Caliph decided to deal with Jalula first; his plan was first to clear the way north before taking any decisive action against Tikrit and Mosul. Umar appointed Hashim ibn Utba to the expedition to Jalula. Some time in April 637, Hashim marched at the head of 12,000 troops from Ctesiphon and, after defeating the Persians at the Battle of Jalula, laid siege to Jalula for seven months, until it surrendered on the usual terms of Jizya.

== Prelude ==
After capturing Ctesiphon, several detachments were immediately sent west to capture Qarqeesia and Heet, forts at the border of Byzantine Empire. Strong Persian garrisons north-east of Ctesiphon at Jalula and north of Tigris at Tikrit and Mosul, posed a threat to Muslim invaders. The greatest threat of all was the Persian concentration at the strategic fort of Jalula.

The Persian forces at Jalula were commanded by general Mihran Razi. His deputy was General Farrukhzad, a brother of General Rostam Farrokhzād, who commanded Persian forces at Battle of Qadisiyyah.

Jalula was a town of great strategic importance, a bottleneck to Northern Iraq. To rule Jalula was to control the gate to Northern Iraq. Persians therefore expected an attack on Jalula. Defense of Jalula was also very important for the strength of the empire and maintaining order in the far-flung frontiers of the Persian Empire.

As instructed by the Caliph Umar, Saad ibn Abi Waqqas, the Muslim commander-in-chief on the Persian front, reported all the strategic situation to Umar who decided to deal with Jalula first. His plan was to first clear his rear before any decisive action further north against Tikrit and Mosul. Umar appointed Hashim ibn Utba to the expedition of Jalula. Some time in April 637, Hashim marched at the head of 12,000 troops from Ctesiphon and made contact with Persians outside Jalula fort.

== Battlefield ==
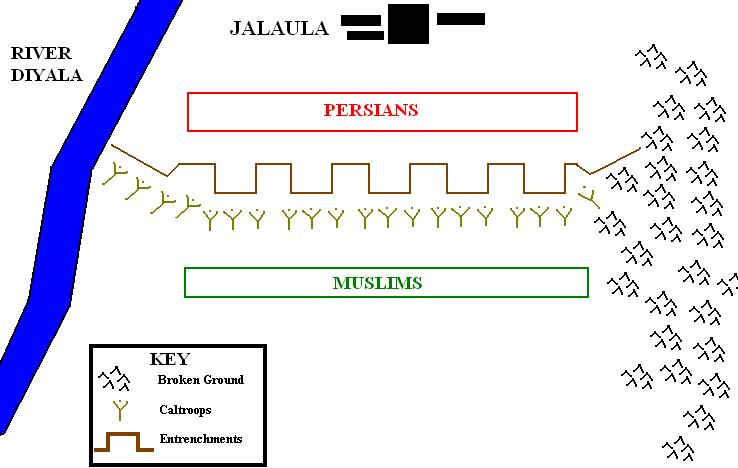
Battle Disposition.

At Jalula, both the flanks of Persians and Muslims rested upon natural obstacles. Diyala River on east and broken ground on the west. Broken ground was unsuitable for cavalry and even the movement of infantry en masse was difficult and would have exposed them to Persian firepower.

== Opposing plans ==
Mihran, the Persian commander at Jalula, was a veteran general who had fought Muslims in Qadisiya and knew well of the Muslims' tactics. He dug entrenchments and placed caltrops in front of them, to slow down Muslim advances. The Persian troops intended to wear the Muslims down by letting them launch a frontal attack, thus exposing themselves to Persian archers and siege engines led artillery. The caltrops also hindered the speed of Muslim cavalry and infantry. Mihran deployed his army in classical defensive formation with the intention of launching the attack when Muslims had suffered enough and the nucleus of their power had been destroyed.

On reaching the battlefield, Hashim, the Muslim commander, analyzed that the Persians could not be attacked from the flanks due to those natural barriers and approaching them from the front would be costly. He decided to lure the Persians out of the defenses of entrenchments and caltrops. Hashim planned to launch a frontal attack and make a feint retreat under Persian fire, and once the Persians were away from their trench, his cavalry would capture the bridge on the trench, cutting off the Persians' escape route.

=== Rashidun troops deployment ===
In the records of Muslim chroniclers from the era of the 7th century to 10–11th centuries there is known the detail about the composition of the Rashidun army and units involved in this battle. There is some version of the deployment composition.

It is recorded by Tabari that the Rashidun army was composed of 12,000 troops with the deployment as follows:

- Hashim ibn Utba as overall commander
- Al-Qa'qa' ibn Amr al-Tamimi commanding the vanguard
- Si'r ibn Malik commanding the right wing of the army.
- Amr ibn Malik ibn Utba commanding the left wing of the army.
- Amr ibn Murra al-Juhani commanding the rear guards.

While Tulayha ibn Khuwaylid ibn Nawfal al-Asadi; Amr ibn Ma'adi Yakrib; Qays ibn Makshuh and Hujr ibn Adi were coming later as the reinforcements. Generally, the overall troops consisted of prominent figures of the Ansar and Muhajirun during the first battles of Muslims and portions of Bedouin who formerly rebelled during Ridda wars

Ahmad ibn A'tham provides a slightly different version from Tabari's composition, namely:

- Jarir ibn Abd Allah al-Bajali commanding the right wing of the army.
- Hujr ibn Abd Allah al-Kindi commanding the left wing of the army.
- Makshuh al-Muradi commanding the obscure placement of wing units of the army.
- Amr ibn Murra al-Juhani commanding the cavalry in the center.
- Tulayha ibn Khuwaylid ibn Nawfal al-Asadi commanding the infantry.

Baladhuri also mentions very briefly a composition which is similar to that of Ahmad ibn A'tham's, except he includes Jarir ibn Abd Allah.

== Battle ==
The battle began with the Muslims' frontal attack; after engaging for some time Muslims feigned a retreat and fell back in an organized manner. Mihran, sensing the time is on hand to launch an offensive, ordered the entrenchments to be bridged. Once the Persian army had attained the battle formation, he ordered a general attack. Up till then the battle had progressed as both commanders had planned. Once Mihran engaged his troops in an open battlefield, Hashim decided to carry out his manoeuvre. He dispatched a strong cavalry regiment under one of his most illustrious cavalry commanders, Qaqa ibn Amr, to capture the bridge over the entrenchments. The bridge was not heavily guarded as virtually all the Persian troops available were used to assault the main body of the Muslim army. Qaqa manoeuvred around the Persian right flank and quickly captured the bridge at their rear. The news of a strong Muslim cavalry detachment in their rear was a serious setback to Persian morale. Hashim launched a frontal attack with Muslim infantry while Qaqa stuck at the Persian rear with his cavalry. Persian troops were trapped between the Muslim army and the natural barriers on the battlefield. Nevertheless, thousands of them managed to escape and reached the Jalula fortress.

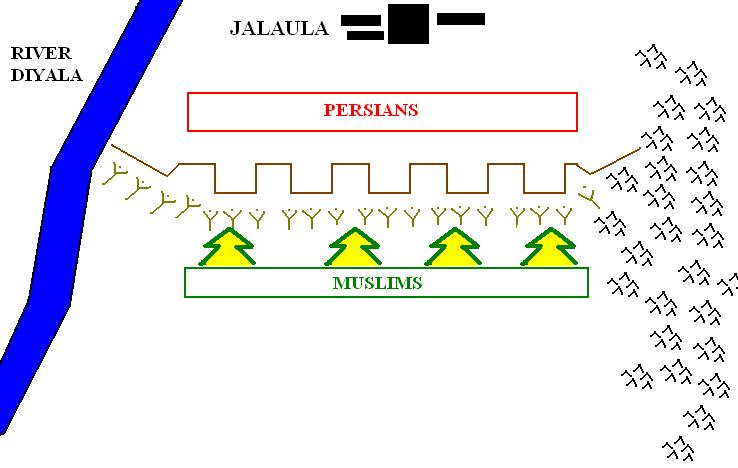
The Muslims' feint retreat

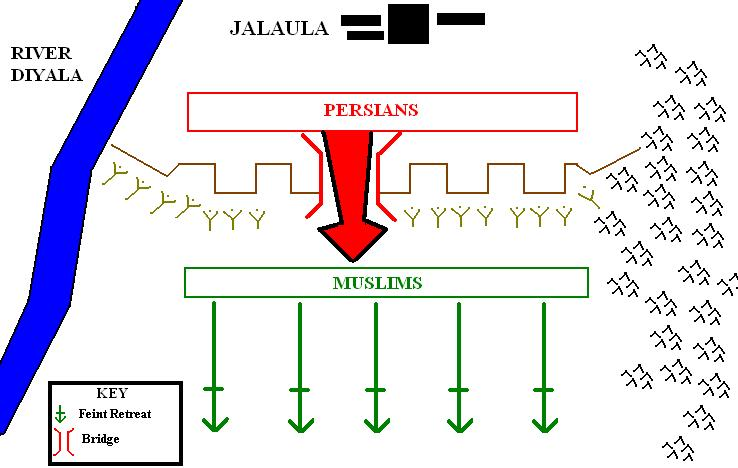
Persian offensive

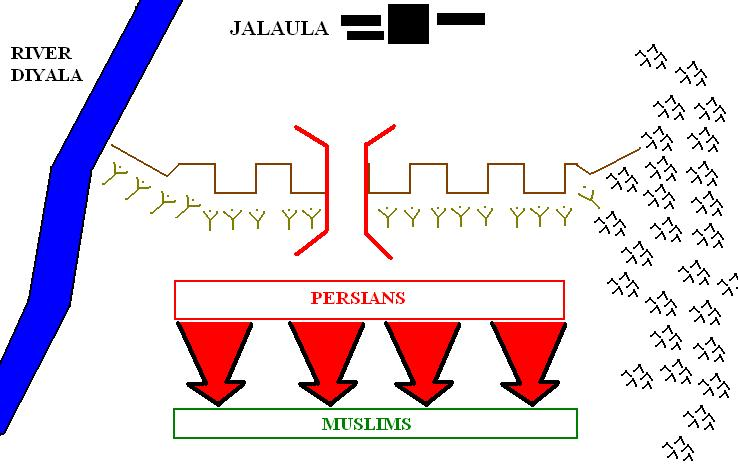
General engagement

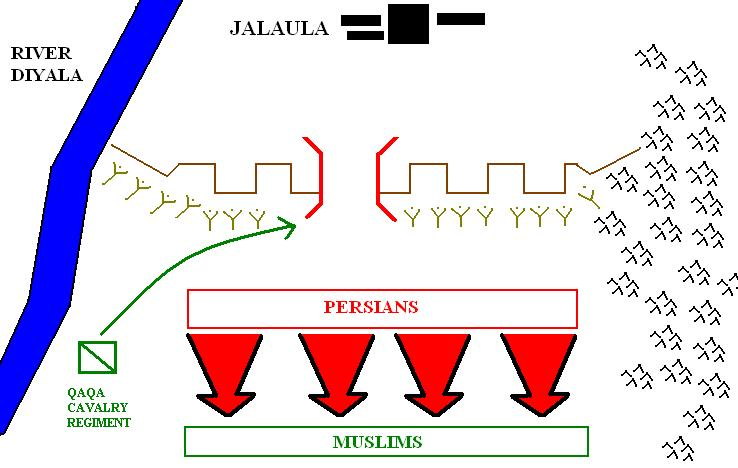
Qaqa's outflanking maneuver

== Aftermath ==
The Persians suffered heavy casualties and the battle ended in a complete Muslim victory. Women and children were enslaved as spoils of war and Umar says « in fear of Children of these Slave-women who are going to be born, I seek refuge in Allah». After the battle Hashim laid siege to Jalula. Persian emperor Yazdegerd III was in no position to send a relief force to Jalula and the fortress surrendered to Muslims seven months later on the terms of annual payment of Jizya (tribute). After capturing Jalula, Muslims captured Tikrit and Mosul, completing their conquest of Iraq.

After the conquest of Iraq (region west of Zagros Mountains) Umar decided to consolidate the conquered territory. He, apparently for the time being, did not want further conquest. He was almost on the defensive until the consistent Persian raids in Iraq compelled him to launch a largescale invasion of the Persian empire.

== See also ==
- Islamic conquest of Persia
- Muslim conquests
- Sassanid Empire
