= Mubarizun =

Rashidun army unit

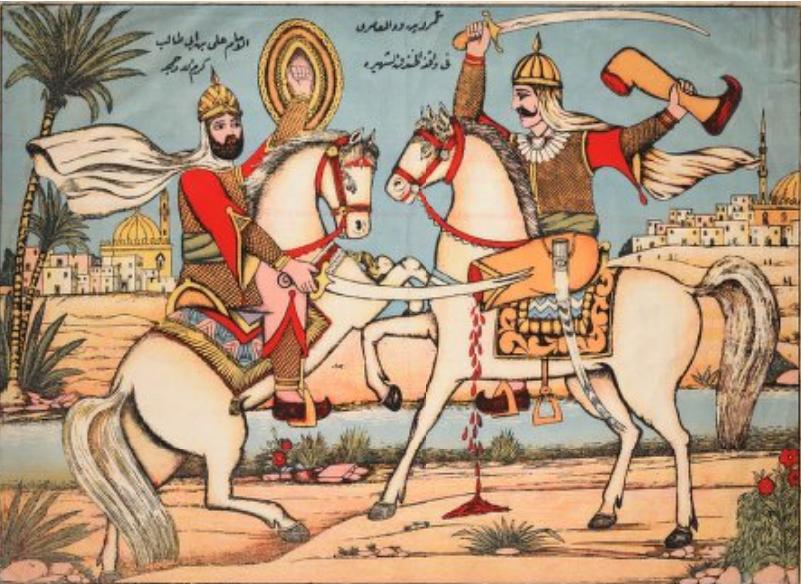
A duel between Ali and Amr ibn Abd al-Wud in the Battle of the Trench

The Mubarizun (Arabic: مبارزون, "duelists", or "champions") formed a special unit of the Rashidun army during the Muslim conquests of the 7th century. The Mubarizun were a recognized part of the Muslim army with the purpose of engaging enemy champions in single combat. In Arab, Byzantine, and Sassanian warfare, battles usually began with duels between the champion warriors of the opposing armies.

The Muslim army would typically begin battle with its soldiers first equipping their armor, assembling their units to their positions and lastly dispatching the Mubarizun. Mubarizun fighters were instructed to refrain from pursuing any defeated enemy champions more than two-thirds of the way to the enemy lines to avoid the risk of being cut off. After the conclusion of the dueling phase, the army would launch its general advance.

== List of notable Mubarizun ==
- Ali ibn Abi Talib
- Hamza ibn Abd al-Muttalib
- Dirar ibn al-Azwar
- Al-Qa'qa' ibn Amr al-Tamimi
- Asim ibn 'Amr al-Tamimi
- Abd al-Rahman ibn Abu Bakr (Son of Caliph Abu Bakr)
- Al-Bara' ibn Malik
- Zubayr ibn al-Awwam

== See also ==
- Mard o mard
- Muslim conquest of Syria

== Bibliography ==
- Nicolle, David (1994). Yarmuk AD 636: The Muslim conquest of Syria. Osprey Publishing. ISBN 1855324148.
- Nicolle, David (1998). Armies of the Caliphates 862-1098. Osprey Publishing. ISBN 1855327708.
