= Hashim ibn Utba =

Muslim army commander (died 657)

- Born: Mecca, Hejaz
- Died: 657; Siffin, Syria
- Relatives: List: Utba ibn Abi Waqqas (father); Sa'd ibn Abi Waqqas; Umayr ibn Abi Waqqas; Amir ibn Abi Waqqas (uncle); Umar ibn Sa'ad (cousin)
- Military career
- Allegiance: Rashidun Caliphate
- Conflicts: Battle of Hunayn; Ridda wars; Battle of Yarmouk; Battle of al-Qadisiyyah; Siege of Ctesiphon (637); Battle of Jalula; Battle of Siffin †

Hashim ibn Utba ibn Abi Waqqas (Arabic: هاشم بن عتبة بن أبي وقاص, romanized: Hāshim ibn ʿUtba ibn Abī Waqqāṣ), was a Muslim army commander. He was Sa'd ibn Abi Waqqas's nephew through his father, and was a companion of Muhammad. Hāshim participated in the Ridda wars to force rebellious Arab tribes to return to Islam after the death of Muhammad. He fought the Byzantines in the Battle of Yarmouk under the command of Khalid ibn al-Walid. He played a vital role in the Battle of al-Qādisiyyah that led to the conquest of Al-Mada'in by Muslims. He died in the Battle of Siffin fighting on the side of Ali.

== Biography ==
Hashim ibn Utbah was born after Muhammad proclaimed his prophethood.

Hashim embraced Islam during the Conquest of Mecca.

During the outbreak of the Great apostate rebellions, Hashim participated against the rebellious Arabic tribes following the death of Mohammad in order to return them to Islam.

Hashim participated in the Battle of the Yarmuk. Ibn 'Abd al-Barr recorded that Hashim lost one of his eyes during this battle.

Shia historian Ibn Musa al-Khwarizmi reported Hashim was sent to Iraq and participated in the Battle of al-Qadisiyyah.

Hashim ibn Utbah was sent by Sa'd ibn Abi Waqqas to lead the army to the battle of Jalula, where Hashim dispatched Jarir ibn Abdullah al-Bajali from the Bajila tribe with a heavy force of cavalry to check the enemy position.
