= Shurahbil ibn Simt =

7th-century Arab Muslim military commander

Shurahbil ibn al-Simt ibn al-Aswad al-Kindi (Arabic: شرحبيل بن السمط بن الأسود الكندي, romanized: Shuraḥbīl ibn al-Simṭ ibn al-Aswad al-Kindī) was a Kindite commander in the Muslim army against the Sasanian Empire at the Battle of al-Qadisiyya in 636 and later a Homs-based member of the inner circle of Mu'awiya I during his governorship of Syria (639–661) and caliphate (661–680).

== Life ==
Shurahbil was the son of the Kindite chieftain Simt ibn al-Aswad. Following the death of the Islamic prophet Muhammad, Shurahbil and his father loyally served the nascent Medina-based Muslim state and fought with distinction during the Ridda Wars against the Arabian tribes that had defected from Medina. As a result, their star rose in Medina at the expense of al-Ash'ath ibn Qays, a rival Kindite chief who fought against the Muslims and repented following his defeat and capture in Yemen. While in the mid to late 630s, Simt played a role in the Muslim conquest of Syria, Shurahbil fought in the Muslim conquest of Iraq. The overall Muslim commander of the Iraqi front, Sa'd ibn Abi Waqqas, appointed the young Shurahbil as commander of the Muslim army's left wing at the decisive Battle of al-Qadisiyya in 636. Following the victory over the Sasanians in Iraq, Shurahbil was appointed by Sa'd the governor of the Sasanian capital at Ctesiphon (al-Mada'in in Arabic). He settled in the newly-established Arab garrison town of Kufa, but emerging as the weaker Kindite against al-Ash'ath in the rivalry for the leadership of the tribe in the city, he moved to join his father in Homs.

During the First Fitna, he became a committed partisan of the Umayyad emir of Syria, Mu'awiya ibn Abi Sufyan, during his conflict with the Kufa-based Caliph Ali (r. 656–661). He served as one of Mu'awiya's envoys to Ali in June 657, a month before the Battle of Siffin between the two sides, which ended in a stalemate. During Mu'awiya's caliphate (661–680) he was a member of the caliph's inner circle. At some point during Mu'awiya's or Yazid I's reign, he was surpassed in influence with the Umayyads by his Syrian Kindite rival, Husayn ibn Numayr al-Sakuni. There is no further record of Shurahbil or his family until the revolt of Yazid ibn al-Muhallab in Iraq in 720 when an unnamed son of Shurahbil was taken prisoner and executed by the rebels. The family was mentioned again during the Third Fitna in 744, when a great-grandson of Shurahbil, Simt ibn Thabit ibn Yazid, joined his erstwhile rival Mu'awiya ibn Yazid, a grandson of Husayn ibn Numayr, in opposition to caliph Yazid III. Simt ibn Thabit was later crucified for leading a revolt in Homs against caliph Marwan II (r. 744–750). The descendants of Shurahbil or rather, his father, temporarily took over Homs in the Fourth Fitna, during Abbasid rule, in the early 9th century.

== Bibliography ==
- Crone, Patricia (1980). Slaves on Horses: The Evolution of the Islamic Polity (1980 ed.). Cambridge: Cambridge University Press. ISBN 978-0521229616.
- Friedmann, Yohanan, ed. (1992). The History of al-Ṭabarī, Volume XII: The Battle of al-Qādisīyyah and the Conquest of Syria and Palestine. SUNY Series in Near Eastern Studies. Albany, New York: State University of New York Press. ISBN 978-0-7914-0733-2.
- Hawting, G. R., ed. (1996). The History of al-Ṭabarī, Volume XVII: The First Civil War: From the Battle of Siffīn to the Death of ʿAlī, A.D. 656–661/A.H. 36–40. SUNY Series in Near Eastern Studies. Albany, New York: State University of New York Press. ISBN 978-0-7914-2393-6.
