= Michael Lecker =

Israeli scholar

Michael Lecker (Hebrew: מייקל לקר; born 1951) is an Israeli scholar who is Emeritus Professor of Arabic Language and Literature at the Hebrew University of Jerusalem. His work focuses on the social and political history of early Islam, with a particular emphasis on prosopography, and on the biography of the Islamic prophet Muhammad. A member of the "Jerusalem School", he was a student of Meir Jacob Kister.

== Career ==
Lecker taught at the Hebrew University between 1978 and 2021. His 1978 Master of Arts thesis (supervised by Yehoshua Blau), titled "Jewish Settlements in Babylonia during the Talmudic Period", traced Talmudic placenames that survived in the geographical literature. His 1983 doctoral thesis (supervised by Meir Jacob Kister), titled "On the Prophet Muhammad's Activity in Medina", analyzed the document that some scholars call the Constitution of Medina and several other topics relating to Muhammad's Medinan period (622-632 CE).

== Prizes and awards ==
- 1975: The Josef David Farhi Prize (Institute of Asian and African Studies)
- 1980: The S.M. Stern Prize (Institute of Asian and African Studies)
- 1983: The Mauricio Richter Fellowship (The Hebrew University)
- 1984-1985: Rothschild Post-Doctoral Fellowship, Yad Hanadiv Foundation, Jerusalem. At the School of Oriental and African Studies, the University of London.
- 1987-1989: Yigal Alon Fellowship, Council for Higher Education, Israel

== Select bibliography ==
Lecker's works include:

- Studies on the Life of Muhammad and the Dawn of Islam: Idol Worshippers, Christians and Jews in Pre- and Early Islam (Variorum Collected Studies). Routledge, 2023. ISBN 1032449829.
- Al-Maqrīzī’s al-Ḫabar ʿan al-bašar: Volume IV, Section 2: The Idols of the Arabs: 8 (Bibliotheca Maqriziana) Brill, 2022. ISBN 9004499830
- “Did Muhammad conclude Treaties with the Jewish Tribes Naḍīr, Qaynuqāʿ, and Qurayẓa,” in Uri Rubin and David Wasserstein, eds., Israel Oriental Studies, Volume 17: Dhimmis and Others: Jews and Christians and the World of Classical Islam (University Park, PA: Eisenbrauns, 1997), pp. 29–36.
- “Glimpses of Muḥammad’s Medinan Decade,” in Jonathan E. Brockopp, ed., The Cambridge Companion to Muḥammad (Cambridge, New York et al.: Cambridge University Press, 2010), pp. 61–82.
- Jews and Arabs in Pre- and Early Islamic Arabia (Abingdon, Oxfordshire: Routledge, 1998).
- Muhammad ve-ha-yehudim (Hebrew: "Muhammad and the Jews") (Jerusalem: Ben Zvi Institute, 2014).
- “Muhammad at Medina: A Geographical Approach,” Jerusalem Studies in Arabic and Islam, 6 (1985), pp. 29–62.
- Muslims, Jews and Pagans: Studies on Early Islamic Medina (Piscataway, NJ: Gorgias Press, 2017).
- “On Arabs of the Banū Kilāb Executed Together with the Jewish Banū Qurayẓa,” Jerusalem Studies in Arabic and Islam, 19 (1995), pp. 66–72.
- People, Tribes and Society in Arabia Around the Time of Muhammad (Abingdon, Oxfordshire: Routledge, 2005).
- “Sulaym,” Encyclopaedia of Islam, Vol. 9, pp. 817–818.
- “The Assassination of the Jewish Merchant Ibn Sunayna according to an Authentic Family Account,” in Nicolet Boekhoff-van der Voort, Kees Versteegh and Joas Wagemakers, eds., The Transmission and Dynamics of the Textual Sources of Islam: Essays in Honour of Harald Motzki (Leiden: Brill, 2011), pp. 181–195.
- The Banū Sulaym: A Contribution to the Study of Early Islam The Max Schloessinger Memorial Series, Monographs IV (Jerusalem: Institute of Asian and African Studies, The Hebrew University, 1989).
- “The Death of the Prophet Muḥammad’s Father: Did Wāqidī Invent Some of the Evidence?,” Zeitschrift der Deutschen Morgenländischen Gesellschaft (145), 1995, pp. 9–27.
- “The Jews of Northern Arabia in Early Islam,” in Phillip I. Lieberman, ed., The Cambridge History of Judaism Vol. 5: Jews in the Medieval Islamic World (Cambridge University Press, 2021), pp. 255–293.
- “Ukaydir ibn ʿAbdul Malik al-Kindī,” Encyclopaedia of Islam, Vol. 10, p. 784.
- “ʿUyayna b. Ḥiṣn,” Encyclopaedia of Islam, Vol. 10, pp. 959–960.
- “Wādī ʾl-Ḳurā,” Encyclopaedia of Islam, Vol. 11, pp. 18–19.
- “Wāqidī (d. 822) vs. Zuhrī (d. 742): The Fate of the Jewish Banū Abī l-Ḥuqayq,” in C. J. Robin, ed., Le judaïsme de l'Arabie antique: Actes du Colloque de Jérusalem (février 2006) (Paris: Brepols, 2015), pp. 495–509.
- “Wāqidī's Account on the Status of the Jews of Medina: A Study of a Combined Report,” Journal of Near Eastern Studies, Vol. 54, No. 1 (January 1995), pp. 15–32.
- “Were there Female Relatives of the Prophet Muḥammad among the Besieged Qurayẓa?” Journal of the American Oriental Society, Vol. 136, No. 2 (April–June 2016), pp. 397–404.
- “Zayd B. Thābit, ‘A Jew with Two Sidelocks’: Judaism and Literacy in Pre-Islamic Medina (Yathrib),” Journal of Near Eastern Studies, Vol. 56, No. 4 (October 1997), pp. 259–273.

== Sources ==
- Biography of Prof. Michael Lecker at Hebrew University of Jerusalem (in English)
- Bibliography of Prof. Michael Lecker at World Catalog
