= Ja'da bint al-Ash'ath =

Wife of al-Hasan ibn Ali

Jaʿda bint al-Ashʿath (Arabic: جعدة بنت الأشعث) (Full name: Jaʿda bint al-Ashʿath ibn Qays al-Kindī) was the wife of Hasan ibn Ali. Shia Muslim historians wrote that Ja'da was promised gold and marriage to Yazid I. Seduced by the promise of wealth and power, she poisoned her husband, and then hastened to the court of Mu'awiya in Damascus to receive her reward. Later Mu’awya reneged on his promise to marry her to his son and married her to another man.

== See also ==
- Husayn ibn Ali
- Hasan–Muawiya treaty
