= Asim ibn Amr al-Tamimi =

Arab military commander

- Allegiance: Rashidun Caliphate
- Rank: Military leader
- Battles / wars: Muslim conquest of Persia

ʿĀṣim ibn ʿAmr ibn Mālik al-Usaydī al-Tamīmī (Arabic: عاصم بن عمرو بن مالك الأسيدي التميمي) was a prominent member of Banu Tamim and military leader of Rashidun Caliphate during the rule of Abu Bakr and Umar.

He played an active role during the Muslim conquest of Persia accompanying his older brother Al-Qa'qa' ibn Amr al-Tamimi.
