= Mihran Razi =

Sasanian military officer (d. 637)

Mihran-i Bahram-i Razi, better known as Mihran Razi, was an Iranian military officer from the Mihran family. He was killed in 637 at the Battle of Jalula.

== Biography ==
Mihran is first mentioned during the Arab invasion of Persia, and is known to have commanded the left wing of the Sasanian army during the Battle of al-Qādisiyyah. Mihran, along with Nakhiragan, Hormuzan and Piruz Khosrow, and the rest of the survivors, regrouped at Bavel (Babylon), where they tried to repel the Arab army, but were once again defeated. While Piruz and Hormuzan fled in different directions, Mihran and Nakhiragan remained in Asoristan.

After a brief stay at Veh-Ardashir, they abandoned and destroyed the bridge on the east bank of the Tigris river. Nakhiragan and Mihran then briefly stayed at Kutha, where they installed a certain dehqan named Shahriyar as the commander of the garrison of the place. The two Sasanian military officers then went to the capital Ctesiphon, which was under attack by the Arabs. However, their stay there was only brief.

After some time, they regrouped again with other Sasanian officers and fought the Arabs at Jalula. The Sasanian forces, however, were once again defeated. Mihran along with the rest of the survivors then fled to Khanaqin, but were at last killed by an Arab force which had pursued them.

== Sources ==
- Pourshariati, Parvaneh (2008). Decline and Fall of the Sasanian Empire: The Sasanian-Parthian Confederacy and the Arab Conquest of Iran. London and New York: I.B. Tauris. ISBN 978-1-84511-645-3.
- Morony, Michael G. (2005) [1984]. Iraq After The Muslim Conquest. Gorgias Press LLC. ISBN 978-1-59333-315-7.
- Zarrinkub, Abd al-Husain (1975). "The Arab conquest of Iran and its aftermath". The Cambridge History of Iran, Volume 4: From the Arab Invasion to the Saljuqs. Cambridge: Cambridge University Press. pp. 1–57. ISBN 978-0-521-20093-6.
- Al-Tabari, Abu Ja'far Muhammad ibn Jarir (1989). Yar-Shater, Ehsan (ed.). The History of al-Tabari Vol. 13: The Conquest of Iraq, Southwestern Persia, and Egypt: The Middle Years of 'Umar's Caliphate A.D. 636-642/A.H. 15-21. Trans. G. H. A. Juynboll. Albany, NY: State University of New York Press. ISBN 0887068766.
