= Battle of Nishapur =

652 battle

- Part of Muslim conquest of Persia
Date	652
Location	Nishapur, Iran
Result	Rashidun Caliphate victory

Belligerents
Rashidun Caliphate; Kanārangīyāns	House of Karen

Commanders and leaders
Abdullah ibn Aamir; Kanadbak	Burzin Shah †; Sawar Karin †

Strength
Unknown	Unknown

Casualties and losses
Heavy	Heavy

The Battle of Nishapur was fought in 652 between the Karen family and the Rashidun Caliphate along with their allies, the Kanārangīyān family.

== Background ==
In 651, Yazdegerd III was murdered by Mahuy Suri, the marzban of Marw. Tabaristan was afterwards invaded by the Muslim Arabs, who were defeated at the battle of Ruyan by the Zoroastrian Dabboyids. Farrukhzad, the previously minister of Yazdegerd, and ruler of Tabaristan, managed to repel the Arabs with the aid of Gil Gavbara and make a treaty with them. The Arabs then invaded Khorasan, and made a treaty with the kanarang of Tus, Kanadbak. In the treaty Kanadbak agreed to pay tribute to the Arabs while still remaining in control of his territories in Tus. In order to strengthen the weakened Karen family, and to reclaim lost Karenid territory, Burzin, along with another Karenid named Sawar Karin, made resistance to the Arabs and tried to reclaim territory from the Kanārangīyān family. In promise of regaining his lost territories, Kanadbak agreed to aid Abdullah in capturing Nishapur from the Karenid rebels.

== Battle ==
Abdullah and Kanadbak started pillaging the areas of Nishapur, and fought heavily to capture the city. Sawar then tried to make peace with Abdullah, and told him that he would open the gates of Nishapur if the latter pardoned him. Abdullah agreed, however, when the gates were opened, he entered the gate with his army, and started to plunder the city and killing citizens, until Kanadbak said to him: "O amir, once you have been victorious and triumphant forgiveness is a higher [virtue] than revenge and retribution." Abdullah then did as the latter said and restored the city to Kanadbak's domains.

== Sources ==
- Pourshariati, Parvaneh (2008). Decline and Fall of the Sasanian Empire: The Sasanian-Parthian Confederacy and the Arab Conquest of Iran. London and New York: I.B. Tauris. ISBN 978-1-84511-645-3.
