= Adergoudounbades =

Sasanian nobleman, general, and kanarang

- Born: Unknown date Sasanian Empire
- Died: 541; Sasanian Empire
- Military career
- Allegiance: Sasanian Empire
- Branch: Military of the Sasanian Empire
- Rank: Kanarang
- Conflicts: Anastasian War; Iberian War

Adergoudounbadēs (Note: His native name was probably Adurgundbad (in New Persian: آذرگندبد), an abbreviation of Adurgushnaspbad. Pourshariati records the native name as Ādhargulbād (آذرگلباد).) (Ancient Greek: Ἀδεργουδουνβάδης, fl. 498–541) was a prominent Sasanian nobleman, general, and kanarang during the reigns of Kavadh I (r. 498–531) and Khosrow I (r. 531–579). He helped Kavadh to seize the throne in 498 and was rewarded with the governorship of Abarshahr. He also gained a military reputation for being undefeated in battle. In 531, he secretly protected the second son of Kavadh I and Khosrow I's potential rival. However, his own son betrayed him in 541, and Khosrow's escort murdered him. His life is known only through the work of the Byzantine historian Procopius.

== Career ==
Adhurgunbadh first appears in historical records in 498. A young man at the time, he already had a reputation as a soldier, according to the contemporary historian Procopius. That year, he helped Kavadh I, who was exiled and living among the Huns, rise to the throne. As a reward, Kavadh raised Adergoudounbades to the important post of kanarang, governor of the northeastern province of Abarshahr which adjoined Hephthalite territory. The position was previously held by his relative, Gushnaspdad (Gousanastades), who was executed.

Little is known about Adergoudounbades in the decades that followed, except that he had considerable success as a general. Procopius reports that he subdued twelve barbarian tribes to Persian rule; historian Ilkka Syvänne also notes that Adergoudounbades was undefeated. He participated in the Anastasian War, being involved in the Siege of Amida (502–503).

When Khosrow I ascended the throne in 531, a conspiracy was formed by Bawi and other nobles who wanted to overthrow him and elevate his nephew Kavadh (Cabades), the son of the king Kavadh I's second eldest son Zames (Note: Zames could not himself claim the throne as he was blind in one eye.) to the throne. The conspiracy was discovered and suppressed, but Kavadh, who was still a child, was away from the court, being raised by Adergoudounbades. Khosrau sent orders to kill Kavadh, but Adergoudounbades disobeyed (after consulting with his wife) and brought him up in secret. In 541, his own son, Bahram (Varrames), betrayed him to the shah who was campaigning in Lazica during the Lazic War. On his return, Khosrow sent Adergoudounbades a message inviting him to join a planned invasion of Byzantine territory. However, Adergoudounbades, who was old at the time, fell from his horse during the journey and broke his leg. Khosrow met Adergoudounbades and sent him to a nearby fortress to treat the injury. However, the king's escort murdered him, and Varanes succeeded his father as kanarang. Kavadh, or someone claiming to be him, fled to Constantinople, where Emperor Justinian I treated him as the true son of Zames.
