= Khorasan =

Historical region of Greater Iran

Coordinates: 36°N 62°E

Khorasan خراسان بزرگ, Xarasan Bozorɡ (Persian)
- Region
- Khorasan and neighbouring regions

- Khorasan and its surroundings in the 7th and 8th centuries
- Countries in Khorasan: Afghanistan, Iran and Turkmenistan. Different regions of Tajikistan, Uzbekistan, Kyrgyzstan and Kazakhstan are also included in different sources.
- Demonym: Khorasani

Ethnicities: Persians, Tajiks, Farsiwans, Turkmens, Uzbeks, Pashtuns, Hazaras, Khorasani Kurds

Khorasan (Note: Middle Persian: 𐬒𐬊𐬭𐬀𐬯𐬀𐬥, romanized: Xwarāsān; Persian: خراسان, Iranian Persian [xoɾɒːˈsɒːn]) is a historical eastern region in the Iranian Plateau in West and Central Asia that encompasses western and northern Afghanistan, northeastern Iran, the eastern halves of Turkmenistan and Uzbekistan, western Tajikistan, and portions of Kyrgyzstan and Kazakhstan.

The extent of the region referred to as Khorasan varied over time. In its stricter historical sense, it comprised most of Afghanistan, the present territories of northeastern Iran and southern parts of Central Asia, extending as far as the Amu Darya (Oxus) river. However, the name has often been used in a loose sense to include a wider region that included most of Transoxiana (encompassing Bukhara and Samarqand in present-day Uzbekistan), extended westward to the Caspian coast and to the Dasht-e Kavir southward to Sistan, and eastward to the Pamir Mountains. Greater Khorasan is today sometimes used to distinguish the larger historical region from the former Khorasan Province of Iran (1906–2004), which roughly encompassed the western portion of the historical Greater Khorasan.

In recent scholarship, Greater Khorasan refers to an extensive interaction sphere in Central Asia during the Middle and Late Bronze Age. The emergence of complex societies during this period is observed especially during 2400–1500 BCE in southern Central Asia. Thus, the rise of the Greater Khorasan Civilization (GKC) of Bronze Age is being considered.

But this interaction sphere of Central Asia goes back even further as far as the early fourth millennium BCE, for example at important sites such as Tepe Hissar in northeastern Iran.

Khorasan was first established as an administrative division in the 6th century (approximately after 520) by the Sasanians, during the reign of Kavad I (r. 488–496, 498/9–531) or Khosrow I (r. 531–579), and comprised the eastern and northeastern parts of the empire. The use of Bactrian Miirosan 'the east' as an administrative designation under Alkhan rulers in the same region is possibly the forerunner of the Sasanian administrative division of Khurasan, occurring after their takeover of Hephthalite territories south of the Oxus. The transformation of the term and its identification with a larger region is thus a development of the late Sasanian and early Islamic periods. Early Islamic usage often regarded everywhere east of Jibal or what was subsequently termed Iraq Ajami (Persian Iraq), as being included in a vast and loosely defined region of Khorasan, which might even extend to the Indus Valley and the Pamir Mountains. The boundary between these two was the region surrounding the cities of Gurgan and Qumis. In particular, the Ghaznavids, Seljuqs and Timurids divided their empires into Iraqi and Khorasani regions. Khorasan is believed to have been bounded in the southwest by desert and the town of Tabas, known as "the Gate of Khorasan", from which it extended eastward to the mountains of central Afghanistan. Sources from the 10th century onwards refer to areas in the south of the Hindu Kush as the Khorasan Marches, forming a frontier region between Khorasan and Hindustan.

== Etymology ==
The name Khorāsān is Persian (from Middle Persian Xwarāsān, sp. xwlʾsʾn', meaning "where the sun arrives from" or "the Eastern Province"). The name was first given to the eastern province of Persia (Ancient Iran) during the Sasanian Empire and was used from the late Middle Ages in distinction to neighbouring Transoxiana. The Sassanian name Xwarāsān has in turn been argued to be a calque of the Bactrian name of the region, Miirosan (Bactrian spelling: μιιροσανο, μιροσανο, earlier μιυροασανο), which had the same meaning 'sunrise, east' (corresponding to a hypothetical Proto-Iranian form *miθrāsāna; see Mithra, Bactrian μιυρο [mihr], for the relevant solar deity). The province was often subdivided into four quarters, such that Nishapur (present-day Iran), Marv (present-day Turkmenistan), Herat and Balkh (present-day Afghanistan) were the centers, respectively, of the westernmost, northernmost, central, and easternmost quarters.

== Geography ==
First established in the 6th century as one of four administrative (military) divisions by the Sasanian Empire, the scope of the region has varied considerably during its nearly 1,500-year history. Initially, the Khorasan division of the Sasanian Empire covered the northeastern military gains of the empire, at its height including cities such as Nishapur, Herat, Merv, Faryab, Taloqan, Balkh, Bukhara, Badghis, Abiward, Gharjistan, Tus and Sarakhs.

With the rise of the Umayyad Caliphate, the designation was inherited and likewise stretched as far as their military gains in the east, starting off with the military installations at Nishapur and Merv, slowly expanding eastwards into Tokharistan and Sogdia. Under the Caliphs, Khorasan was the name of one of the three political zones under their dominion (the other two being Eraq-e Arab "Arabic Iraq" and Eraq-e Ajam "Non-Arabic Iraq or Persian Iraq"). Under the Umayyad and Abbasid caliphates, Khorasan was divided into four major sections or quarters (rub′), each section based on a single major city: Nishapur, Merv, Herat and Balkh. By the 10th century, Ibn Khordadbeh and the Hudud al-'Alam mentions what roughly encompasses the previous regions of Abarshahr, Tokharistan and Sogdia as Khwarasan proper. They further report the southern part of the Hindu Kush, i.e. the regions of Sistan, Rukhkhudh, Zabulistan and Kabul etc. to make up the Khorasan marches, a frontier region between Khorasan and Hindustan.

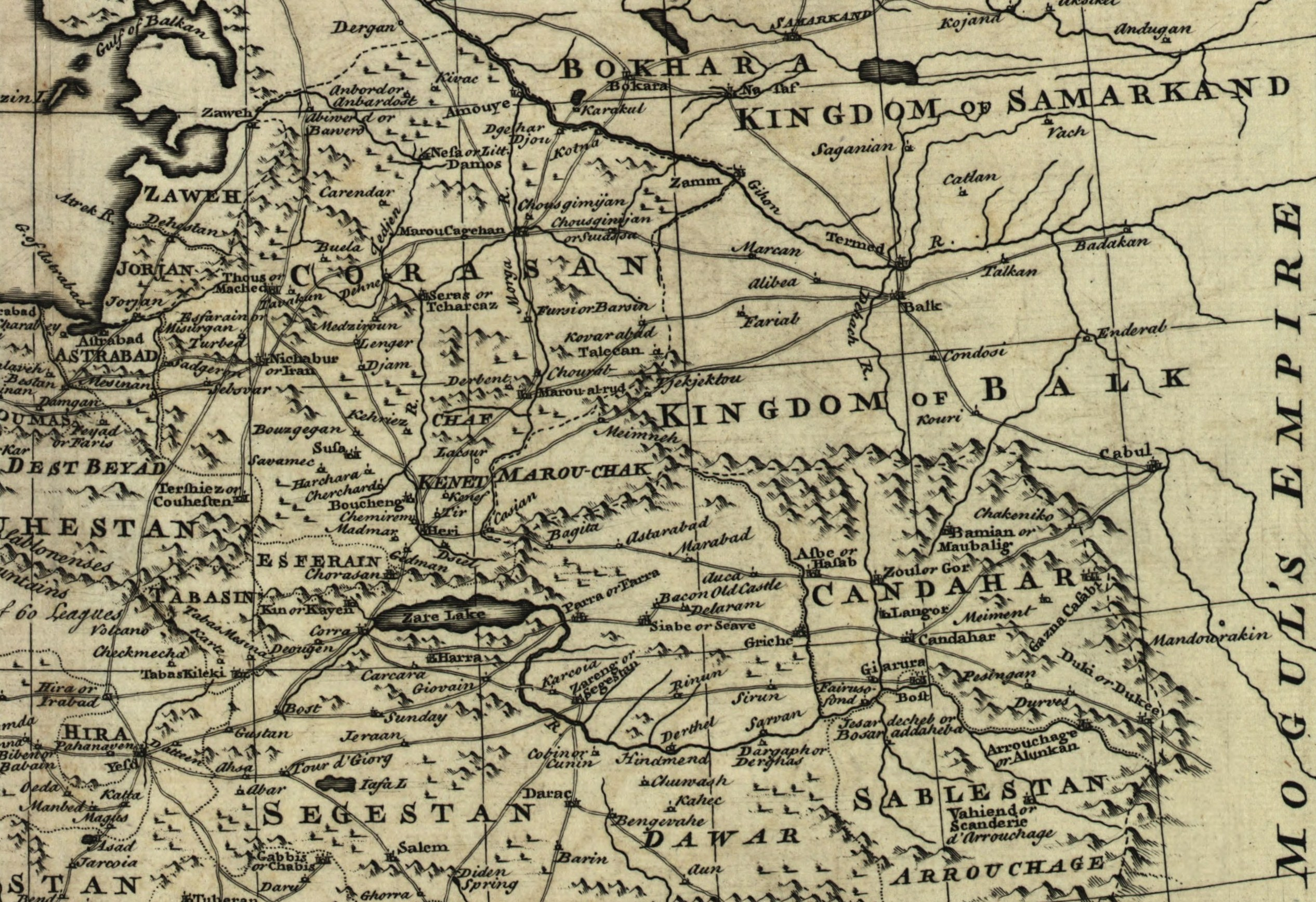
A map of Persia by Emanuel Bowen showing the names of territories during the Persian Safavid dynasty and Mughal Empire of India (c. 1500–1747)

By the late Middle Ages, the term lost its administrative significance, in the west only being loosely applied among the Turko-Persian dynasties of modern Iran to all its territories that lay east and north-east of the Dasht-e Kavir desert. It was therefore subjected to constant change, as the size of their empires changed. In the east, Khwarasan likewise became a term associated with the great urban centers of Central Asia. It is mentioned in the Baburnama (from the 1580s) that:

The people of Hindustān call every country beyond their own Khorasān, in the same manner as the Arabs term all except Arabia, Ajem. On the road between Hindustān and Khorasān, there are two great marts: the one Kābul, the other Kandahār. Caravans, from Ferghāna, Tūrkestān, Samarkand, Balkh, Bokhāra, Hissār, and Badakhshān, all resort to Kābul; while those from Khorasān repair to Kandahār. This country lies between Hindustān and Khorasān.

In modern times, the term has been source of great nostalgia and nationalism, especially amongst the Tajiks of Central Asia. Many Tajiks regard Khorasan as an integral part of their national identity, which has preserved an interest in the term, including its meaning and cultural significance, both in common discussion and academia, despite its falling out of political use in the region.

According to Afghan historian Ghulam Mohammad Ghobar (1897–1978), Afghanistan's current Persian-speaking territories formed the major portion of Khorasān, as two of the four main capitals of Khorasān (Herat and Balkh) are now located in Afghanistan. Ghobar uses the terms "Proper Khorasan" and "Improper Khorasan" in his book to distinguish between the usage of Khorasān in its strict sense and its usage in a loose sense. According to him, Proper Khorasan contained regions lying between Balkh in the east, Merv in the north, Sistan in the south, Nishapur in the west and Herat, known as the Pearl of Khorasan, in the center. Improper Khorasan's boundaries extended to as far as Hazarajat and Kabul in the east, Baluchistan in the south, Transoxiana and Khwarezm in the north, and Damghan and Gorgan in the west.

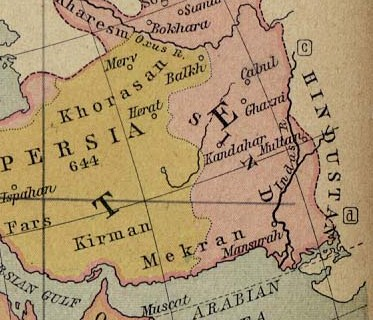
Names of territories during the Caliphate in 750

== History ==
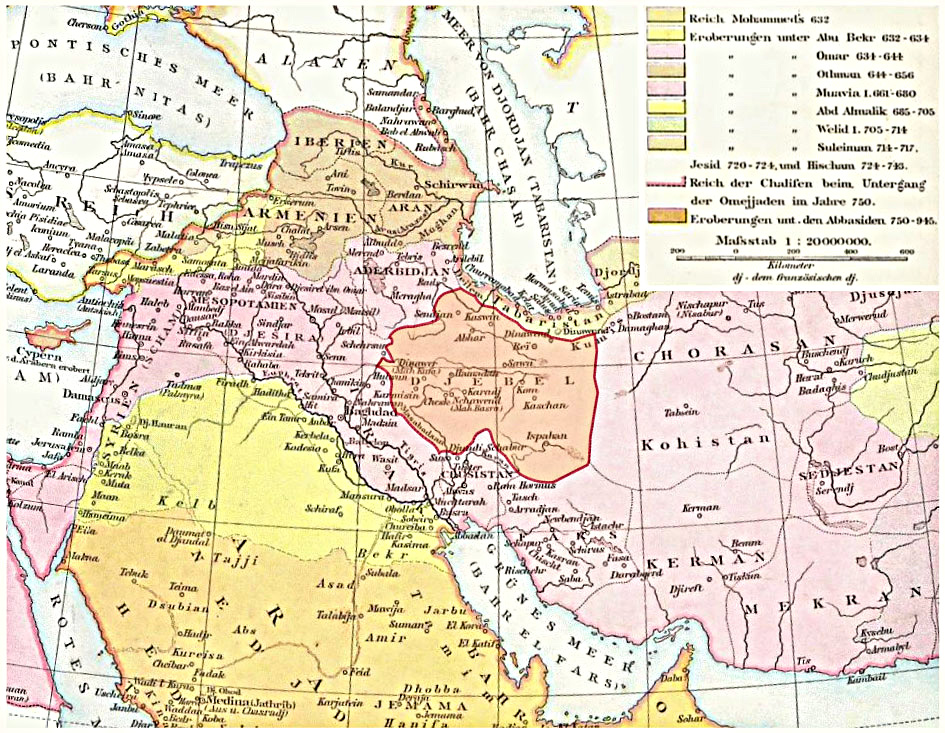
An 1886 map of the 10th century Near East showing Khorasan east of the province of Jibal.

=== Ancient era ===
During the Sasanian era, likely in the reign of Khusrow I, Persia was divided into four regions (known as kust in Middle Persian), Khwārvarān in the west, apāxtar in the north, nīmrūz in the south and Khorasan in the east. Since the Sasanian territories were more or less remained stable up to Islamic conquests, it can be concluded that Sasanian Khorasan was bordered to the south by Sistan and Kerman, to the west by the central deserts of modern Iran, and to the east by China and India.

In the Sasanian era, Khorasan was further divided into four smaller regions, and each region was ruled by a marzban. These four regions were Nishapur, Marv, Herat and Balkh.

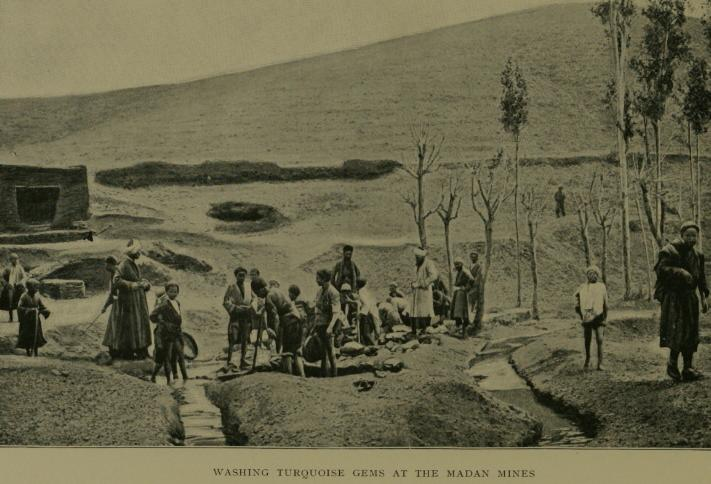
An early turquoise mine in the Madan village of Khorasan during the early 20th century

Khorasan in the east saw some conflict with the Hephthalites who became the new rulers in the area but the borders remained stable. Being the eastern parts of the Sassanids and further away from Arabia, Khorasan region was conquered after the remaining Persia. The last Sassanid king of Persia, Yazdgerd III, moved the throne to Khorasan following the Arab invasion in the western parts of the empire. After the assassination of the king, Khorasan was conquered by Arab Muslims in 647 CE. Like other provinces of Persia it became a province of the Umayyad Caliphate.

=== Medieval era ===
The first movement against the Arab conquest was led by Abu Muslim Khorasani between 747 and 750. Originally from Isfahan, scholars believe Abu Muslim was probably Persian. It's possible he may have been born a slave. According to the ancient Persian historian Al-Shahrastani, he was a Kaysanite. This revolutionary Shi'a movement rejected the three Caliphs that had preceded Ali.

Abu Muslim helped the Abbasids come to power but was later killed by Al-Mansur, an Abbasid Caliph. The first kingdom independent from Arab rule was established in Khorasan by Tahir Phoshanji in 821, but it seems that it was more a matter of political and territorial gain. Tahir had helped the Caliph subdue other nationalistic movements in other parts of Persia such as Maziar's movement in Tabaristan.

Other major independent dynasties who ruled over Khorasan were the Saffarids from Zaranj (861–1003), Samanids from Bukhara (875–999), Ghaznavids from Ghazni (963–1167), Seljuqs (1037–1194), Khwarezmids (1077–1231), Ghurids (1149–1212), and Timurids (1370–1506). In 1221, Genghis Khan's son Tolui oversaw the Mongol subjugation of Khorasan, carrying out the task "with a thoroughness from which that region has never recovered."

Throughout the nineteenth and twentieth century, the majority of Islamic archaeological efforts were focused on the medieval era, predominantly in areas near what is today Central Asia.

==== Rashidun era (651–661) ====
Under Caliph Umar (r. 634–644), the Rashidun Caliphate seized nearly the entire Persia from the Sasanian Empire. However, the areas of Khorasan were not conquered until c. 651 during the caliphate of Uthman (r. 644–656). The Rashidun commanders Ahnaf ibn Qays and Abd Allah ibn Amir were assigned to lead the invasion of Khorasan. In late 651, the Rashidun army defeated the combined forces of the Sasanian and the First Turkic Khaganate in the Battle of the Oxus River. The next year, Ibn Amir concluded a peace treaty with Kanadbak, an Iranian nobleman and the kanarang of Tus. The Sasanian rebel Burzin Shah, of the Karen family, revolted against Ibn Amir, though the latter crushed the rebels in the Battle of Nishapur.

==== Umayyad era (661–750) ====
After the invasion of Persia under Rashidun was completed in five years and almost all of the Persian territories came under Arab control, it also inevitable created new problems for the caliphate. Pockets of tribal resistance continued for centuries in the Afghan territories. During the 7th century, Arab armies made their way into the region of Afghanistan from Khorasan. A second problem was as a corollary to the Muslim conquest of Persia, the Muslims became neighbors of the city states of Transoxiana. Although Transoxiana was included in the loosely defined "Turkestan" region, only the ruling elite of Transoxiana was partially of Turkic origins whereas the local population was mostly a diverse mix of local Iranian populations. As the Arabs reached Transoxiana following the conquest of the Sassanid Persian Empire, local Iranian-Turkic and Arab armies clashed over the control of Transoxiana's Silk Road cities. In particular, the Turgesh under the leadership of Suluk, and Khazars under Barjik clashed with their Arab neighbours in order to control this economically important region. Two notable Umayyad generals, Qutayba ibn Muslim and Nasr ibn Sayyar, were instrumental in the eventual conquest. In July 738, at the age of 74, Nasr was appointed as governor of Khorasan. Despite his age, he was widely respected both for his military record, his knowledge of the affairs of Khorasan and his abilities as a statesman. Julius Wellhausen wrote of him that "His age did not affect the freshness of his mind, as is testified not only by his deeds, but also by the verses in which he gave expression to his feelings till the very end of his life". However, in the climate of the times, his nomination owed more to his appropriate tribal affiliation than his personal qualities.

In 724, immediately after the rise of Hisham ibn Abd al-Malik (r. 724–743) to the throne, Asad's brother Khalid al-Qasri was appointed to the important post of governor of Iraq, with responsibility over the entire Islamic East, which he held until 738. Khalid in turn named Asad as governor of Khorasan. The two brothers thus became, according to Patricia Crone, "among the most prominent men of the Marwanid period". Asad's arrival in Khorasan found the province in peril: his predecessor, Muslim ibn Sa'id al-Kilabi, had just attempted a campaign against Ferghana and suffered a major defeat, the so-called "Day of Thirst", at the hands of the Turgesh Turks and the Soghdian principalities of Transoxiana that had risen up against Muslim rule.

From the early days of the Muslim conquests, Arab armies were divided into regiments drawn from individual tribes or tribal confederations (butun or 'asha'ir). Despite the fact that many of these groupings were recent creations, created for reasons of military efficiency rather than any common ancestry, they soon developed a strong and distinct identity. By the beginning of the Umayyad period, this system progressed to the formation of ever-larger super-groupings, culminating in the two super-groups: the northern Arab Mudaris or Qaysis, and the south Arabs or "Yemenis" (Yaman), dominated by the Azd and Rabi'ah tribes. By the 8th century, this division had become firmly established across the Caliphate and was a source of constant internal instability, as the two groups formed in essence two rival political parties, jockeying for power and separated by a fierce hatred for each other. During Hisham ibn Abd al-Malik's reign, the Umayyad government appointed Mudaris as governors in Khorasan, except for Asad ibn Abdallah al-Qasri's tenure in 735–738. Nasr's appointment came four months after Asad's death. In the interim, the sources report variously that the province was run either by the Syrian general Ja'far ibn Hanzala al-Bahrani or by Asad's lieutenant Juday' al-Kirmani. At any rate, the sources agree that al-Kirmani stood at the time as the most prominent man in Khorasan and should have been the clear choice for governor. His Yemeni roots (he was the leader of the Azd in Khorasan), however, made him unpalatable to the Caliph.

==== Abbasid era (750–861) ====
Khorasan became the headquarters of the Abbasid Revolution against the Umayyads. It was led by Abu Muslim, who himself belonged to Khorasan. This province was part of the Iranian world that had been heavily colonised by Arab tribes following the Muslim conquest with the intent of replacing Umayyad dynasty which is proved to be successful under the sign of the Black Standard.

=== Modern era ===
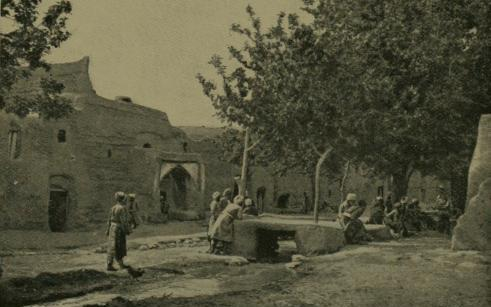
The village of Madan in 1909

Between the early 16th and early 18th centuries, parts of Khorasan were contested between the Safavids and the Uzbeks. A part of the Khorasan region was conquered in 1722 by the Ghilji Pashtuns from Kandahar and became part of the Hotaki dynasty from 1722 to 1729. Nader Shah recaptured Khorasan in 1729 and chose Mashhad as the capital of Persia. Following his assassination in 1747, the eastern parts of Khorasan, including Herat were annexed with the Durrani Empire. Mashhad area was under control of Nader Shah's grandson Shahrukh Afshar until it was captured by the Qajar dynasty in 1796. In 1856, the Iranians, under the Qajar dynasty, briefly recaptured Herat; by the Treaty of Paris of 1857, signed between Iran and the British Empire to end the Anglo-Persian War, the Iranian troops withdrew from Herat. Later, in 1881, Iran relinquished its claims to a part of the northern areas of Khorasan to the Russian Empire, principally comprising Merv, by the Treaty of Akhal (also known as the Treaty of Akhal-Khorasan).

== Cultural importance ==
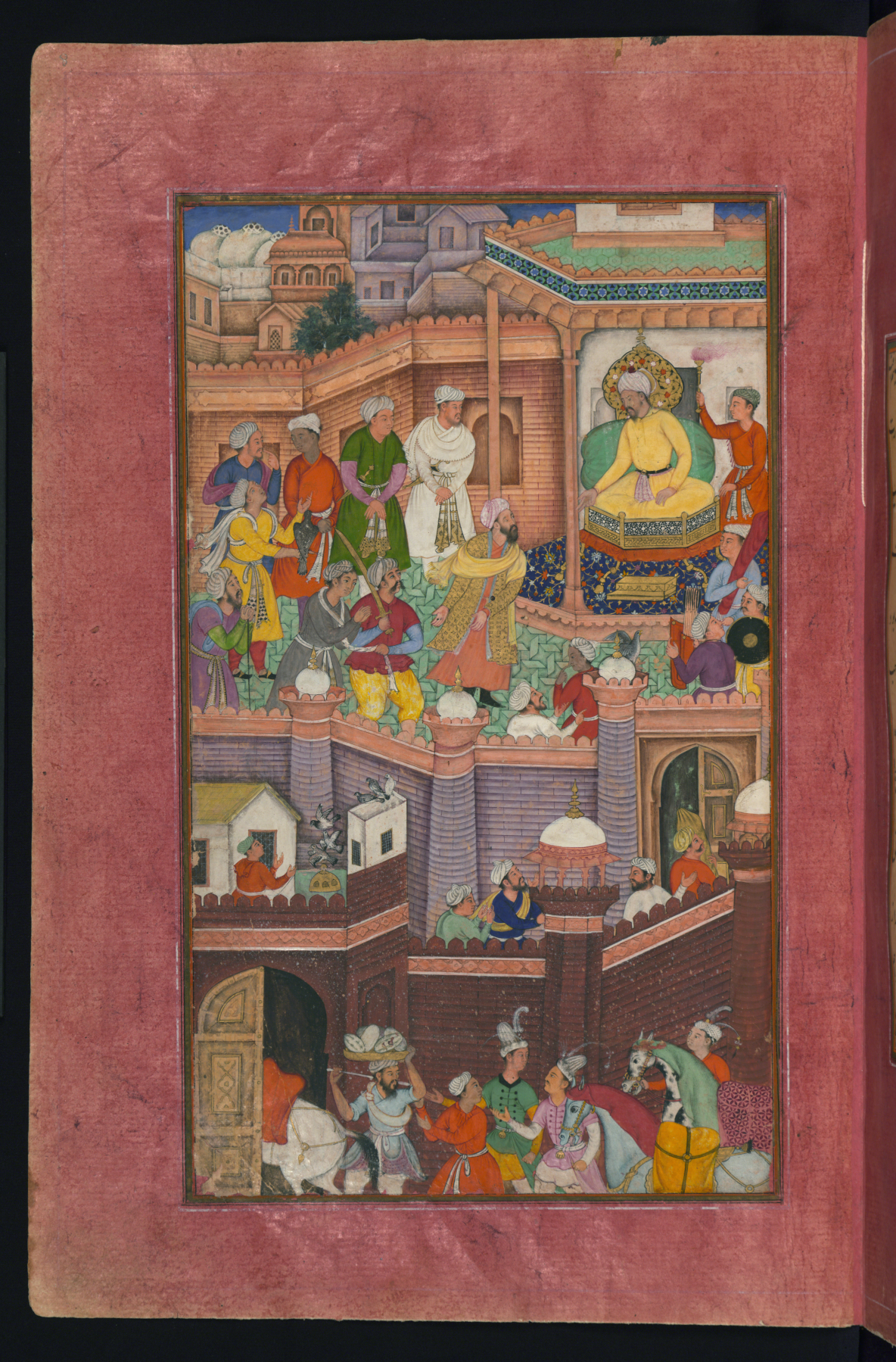
Timurid conqueror Babur exiles his treacherous relative Muḥammad Ḥusaym Mīrzā to Khorasan.

Khorasan has had a great cultural importance among other regions in Greater Iran. The literary New Persian language developed in Khorasan and Transoxiana and gradually supplanted the Parthian language. The New Persian literature arose and flourished in Khorasan and Transoxiana where the early Iranian dynasties such as Tahirids, Samanids, Saffirids and Ghaznavids (a Turco-Persian dynasty) were based.

Until the devastating Mongol invasion of the 13th century, Khorasan remained the cultural capital of Persia. It has produced scientists such as Avicenna, Al-Farabi, Al-Biruni, Omar Khayyam, Al-Khwarizmi, Abu Ma'shar al-Balkhi (known as Albumasar or Albuxar in the west), Alfraganus, Abu Wafa, Nasir al-Din al-Tusi, Sharaf al-Dīn al-Ṭūsī, and many others who are widely well known for their significant contributions in various domains such as mathematics, astronomy, medicine, physics, geography, and geology.

There have been many archaeological sites throughout Khorasan, however many of these expeditions were illegal or committed in the sole pursuit of profit, leaving many sites without documentation or record.

== See also ==
- Ariana
- Bactria
- Dahistan
- Greater Central Asia
- Khwarazm
- Khurasan Road
- Margiana
- Parthia
- Sogdia
- Tokharistan
- Transoxiana
- Baluchistan
- Turkestan
- Bibliography of the history of Central Asia
