= Muslim conquest of Persia =

Rashidun Caliphate's conquest of the Sasanian Empire

- Part of the early Muslim conquests
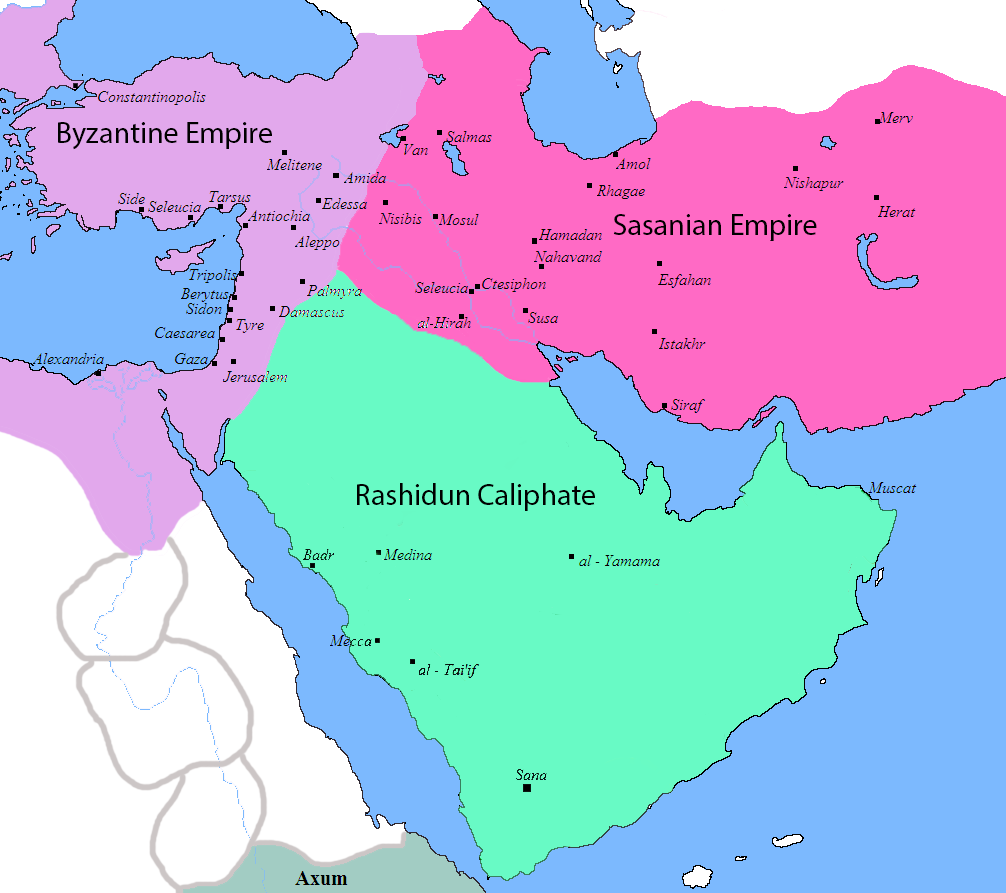
- Map of West Asia, depicting the approximate territorial boundaries of the Byzantine Empire, the Rashidun Caliphate, and the Sasanian Empire prior to the Muslim conquests
Date	633–651
Location	Mesopotamia, Caucasus, Persia, and Greater Khorasan
Result	Muslim victory
Territorial changes	Annexation of the Sasanian Empire by the Rashidun Caliphate

Belligerents
Rashidun Caliphate	Sasanian Empire; Kanārangīyāns; House of Ispahbudhan; House of Mihran; House of Karen; House of Suren

Commanders and leaders
See list: Abu Bakr #; Umar ibn al-Khattab X; Uthman ibn Affan; Khalid ibn al-Walid (Note: Commanded the initial campaigns in Iraq before being redeployed by Caliph Abu Bakr to support the Syrian front); Al-Muthanna ibn Haritha (WIA); Abu Ubayd al-Thaqafi †; Sa'd ibn Abi Waqqas; Hashim ibn Utba; Shurahbil ibn Simt; Tulayha ibn Khuwaylid †; Amr ibn Ma'adi Yakrib †; Abu Musa al-Ash'ari; Hurqus ibn Zuhayr; Ammar ibn Yasir; Al-Nu'man ibn Muqarrin †; Al-Ala al-Hadhrami; Arfajah ibn Harthama; Hudhayfah ibn al-Yaman; Al-Mughira ibn Shu'ba; Uthman ibn Abi al-As; Al-Qa'qa' ibn Amr al-Tamimi; Asim ibn Amr al-Tamimi; Iyad ibn Ghanm; Khalid ibn Urfuta; Al-Ahnaf ibn Qays; Abd Allah ibn Amir; Bukayr ibn Abdallah; Abd al-Rahman ibn Rabi'a; Abd al-Rahman ibn Samura; Samura ibn Jundab; Abd Allah ibn Khazim; Rabi ibn Ziyad al-Harithi; Sa'id ibn al-As	See list: Yazdegerd III X; Rostam Farrokhzad †; Farrukhzad (surrendered); Hormozd Jadhuyih; Bahman Jadhuyih †; Andarzaghar; Piruz Khosrow †; Mihran Bahram-i Chobin; Hormuzan (POW); Mardanshah †; Isfandyadh (surrendered); Jalinus †; Mihran Razi †; Azadbeh; Siyavakhsh †; Shahriyar bin Kanara †; Busbuhra (DOW); Shahriyar of Derbent †; Mihran-i Hamadani †; Shahrvaraz Jadhuyih †; Mushegh III Mamikonian †; Muta of Daylam †; Narsi; Kanadbak (surrendered); Mardanshah of Damavand (surrendered); Juansher; Burzin Shah; Mahoe Suri (surrendered); Siyah al-Uswari (surrendered); Aparviz of Sistan (surrendered); Shahrag †; Faylakan †; Yazdanfar (surrendered)

The Muslim conquest of Persia, also known as the Arab conquest of Iran, occurred between 633 and 651 CE, when the Rashidun Caliphate conquered the Sasanian Empire as part of the early Muslim conquests, which began under the Islamic prophet Muhammad in 627/628.

== Historical context ==
While Arabia was witnessing the rise of Islam in the 7th century, Persia was facing significant political, economic and social challenges, and the Sasanian army had been heavily strained by the Byzantine–Sasanian War of 602–628.

Following the execution of Sasanian shah Khosrow II in 628, Persia's internal political stability began to deteriorate rapidly, leading to ten new royal claimants being enthroned within the next four years. Shortly afterwards, Persia was further devastated by the Sasanian Interregnum, a large-scale civil war that began in 628 and resulted in the government's decentralization by 632.

The first Rashidun invasion of Sasanian territory took place in 633, when the Rashidun army conquered parts of Asoristan, which was the Sasanians' political and economic centre in Mesopotamia. Later, the regional Rashidun army commander Khalid ibn al-Walid was transferred to oversee the Muslim conquest of the Levant, and as the Rashidun army became increasingly focused on the Byzantine Empire, the newly conquered Mesopotamian territories were retaken by the Sasanian army.

The second Rashidun invasion began in 636, under Sa'd ibn Abi Waqqas, when a decisive victory at the Battle of al-Qadisiyyah, put a permanent end to any Sasanian control west of modern-day Iran. For the next six years, the Zagros Mountains, a natural barrier, marked the political boundary between the Rashidun Caliphate and the Sasanian Empire. In 642, Umar ibn al-Khattab, eight years into his reign as Islam's second caliph, ordered a full-scale invasion of the rest of the Sasanian Empire. Directing the war from the city of Medina in Arabia, Umar's quick conquest of Persia in a series of coordinated and multi-pronged attacks became his greatest triumph, contributing to his reputation as a great military and political strategist. In 644, however, he was assassinated by the Persian craftsman Abu Lu'lu'a Firuz, who had been captured by Rashidun troops and brought to Arabia as a slave.

Some Iranian historians have defended their forefathers by using Arab sources to illustrate that "contrary to the claims of some historians, Iranians, in fact, fought long and hard against the invading Arabs." By 651, most of the urban centres in Iranian lands, with the notable exception of the provinces along the Caspian Sea such as Tabaristan and Transoxiana, had come under Muslim domination. Many localities fought against the invaders; although the Rashidun army had established hegemony over most of the country, many cities rose in rebellion by killing their Arab governors or attacking their garrisons. Eventually, military reinforcements quashed the Iranian insurgencies and imposed complete control. The Islamization of Iran was gradual and incentivized in various ways over a period of centuries, though some Iranians never converted and there is evidence of Zoroastrian scriptures and all other pre-Islamic being burnt and Zoroastrian priests being executed, particularly in areas that were centers of resistance. Islam had become Iran's predominant religion by the Late Middle Ages; the majority of Iranians were Sunni Muslims until the Safavids forcefully converted Iran to Shia Islam in the 16th century.

This was the first time since the collapse of the Neo-Babylonian Empire in 539 BCE at the Battle of Opis, that Mesopotamia was ruled again by Semitic-speaking people. This was after centuries of Iranian rule under the Achaemenid, Parthian and Sasanian empires, as well as the Greco-Roman Macedonian, Seleucid, and Roman empires.

This event led to the decline of Zoroastrianism, which had been the official religion of Persia (or Iran) since the time of the Achaemenid Empire, circa 550 BCE. The persecution of Zoroastrians within the Rashidun Caliphate during and after this conflict prompted many of them to flee eastward to India, where they were taken as refugees by various kings.

== Historiography and recent scholarship ==
When Western academics first investigated the Muslim conquest of Persia, they relied solely on the accounts of the Armenian Christian bishop Sebeos, and accounts in Arabic written some time after the events they describe. The most significant work was probably that of Arthur Christensen, and his L’Iran sous les Sassanides, published in Copenhagen and Paris in 1944.

Recent scholarship has begun to question the traditional narrative: Parvaneh Pourshariati, in her Decline and Fall of the Sasanian Empire: The Sasanian-Parthian Confederacy and the Arab Conquest of Iran, published in 2008, provides both a detailed overview of the problematic nature of trying to establish exactly what happened, and a great deal of original research that questions fundamental facts of the traditional narrative, including the timeline and specific dates.

Pourshariati's central thesis is that contrary to what was commonly assumed, the Sassanian Empire was highly decentralized, and was in fact a "confederation" with the Parthians, who themselves retained a high level of independence. Despite their recent victories over the Byzantine Empire, the Parthians unexpectedly withdrew from the confederation, and the Sassanians were thus ill-prepared and ill-equipped to mount an effective and cohesive defense against the Muslim armies. Moreover, the powerful northern and eastern Parthian families, the kust-i khwarasan and kust-i adurbadagan, withdrew to their respective strongholds and made peace with the Arabs, refusing to fight alongside the Sasanians.

Another important theme of Pourshariati's study is a re-evaluation of the traditional timeline. Pourshariati argues that the Arab conquest of Mesopotamia "took place, not, as has been conventionally believed, in the years 632–634, after the accession of the last Sasanian king Yazdegerd III (632–651) to power, but in the period from 628 to 632." An important consequence of this change in timeline means that the Arab conquest started precisely when the Sassanians and Parthians were engaged in internecine warfare over succession to the Sassanian throne.

== Sasanian Empire before the conquest ==
Since the 1st century BC, the border between the Roman (later Byzantine) and Parthian (later Sasanian) empires had been the Euphrates River. The border was constantly contested. Most battles, and thus most fortifications, were concentrated in the hilly regions of the north, as the vast Arabian or Syrian Desert (Roman Arabia) separated the rival empires in the south. The only dangers expected from the south were occasional raids by nomadic Arab tribesmen. Both empires therefore allied themselves with small, semi-independent Arab principalities, which served as buffer states and protected Byzantium and Persia from Bedouin attacks. The Byzantine clients were the Ghassanids; the Persian clients were the Lakhmids. The Ghassanids and Lakhmids feuded constantly, which kept them occupied, but that did not greatly affect the Byzantines or the Persians. In the 6th and 7th centuries, various factors destroyed the balance of power that had held for so many centuries.

The conflict with the Byzantines greatly contributed to its weakness, by draining Sassanid resources, leaving it a prime target for the Muslims.

=== Social problems ===
Sasanian society was divided into four classes: priests, warriors, secretaries, and commoners. The latter formed the bulk of the population, served as its sole tax base, and remained its poorest class.

At the climax of Khosrow II's ambitious Byzantine territory conquests in the Levant and much of Asia Minor, taxes rose dramatically, and most people could not pay. Years of Sassanid-Byzantine wars had ruined trade routes and industry, the population's main income sources. The existing Sassanid administrative structure proved inadequate when faced with the combined demands of a suddenly expanded empire, economy, and population. Rapid turnover of rulers and increasing provincial landholder (dehqan) power further diminished the Sasanians. Over a period of fourteen years and twelve successive kings, the Sassanid Empire weakened considerably, and the power of the central authority passed into the hands of its generals. Even when a strong king emerged following a series of coups, the Sassanids never completely recovered.

=== Events ===
==== Revolt of the Arab client states (602) ====
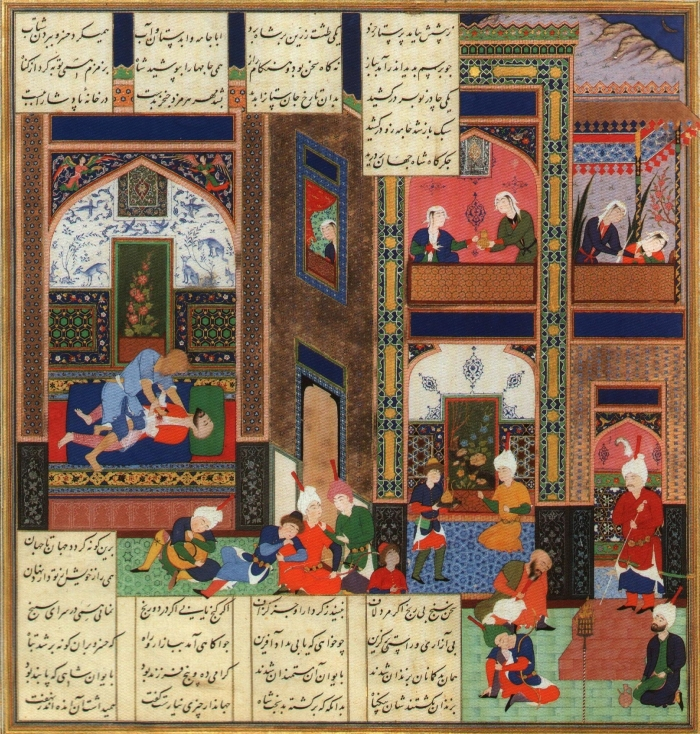
The assassination of Khosrow II in a manuscript of the Shahnameh of Shah Tahmasp made by Abd al-Samad c. 1535

The Byzantine clients, the Arab Ghassanids, converted to the Monophysite form of Christianity, which was regarded as heretical by the established Byzantine Eastern Orthodox Church. The Byzantines attempted to suppress the heresy, alienating the Ghassanids and sparking rebellions on their desert frontiers. The Lakhmids also revolted against the Persian king Khusrau II. Nu'man III (son of Al-Monder IV), the first Christian Lakhmid king, was deposed and killed by Khusrau II in 602, because of his attempt to throw off Persian suzerainty. After Khusrau's assassination in 628, the Persian Empire fractured and the Lakhmids were effectively semi-independent. It is now widely believed that the annexation of the Lakhmid kingdom was one of the main factors behind the fall of the Sasanian Empire and the subsequent Islamic conquest of Persia, as the Lakhmids agreed to act as spies for the Muslims after being defeated in the Battle of Hira by Khalid ibn al-Walid.

==== Byzantine–Sassanid War (602–628) ====
The Persian ruler Khosrow II defeated a dangerous rebellion within his own empire, Bahram Chobin's rebellion. He then turned his focus to his traditional Byzantine enemies, leading to the Byzantine-Sassanid War of 602–628. For a few years, he succeeded. From 612 to 622, he extended the Persian borders almost to the same extent that they were under the Achaemenid dynasty (550–330 BC), capturing Western states as far as Egypt, Palestine (the conquest of the latter being assisted by a Jewish army), and more.

The Byzantines regrouped and pushed back in 622 under Heraclius. Khosrow was defeated at the Battle of Nineveh in 627, and the Byzantines recaptured all of Syria and penetrated far into the Persian provinces of Mesopotamia. In 629, Khosrow's general Shahrbaraz agreed to peace, and the border between the two empires was once again the same as it had been in 602.

==== Plague of Sheroe ====
The Plague of Sheroe (627–628) was one of several epidemics that occurred in or close to Iran within two centuries after the first epidemic was brought by the Sasanian armies from its campaigns in Constantinople, Syria, and Armenia. It caused the death of many Aryan and therefore contributed to the fall of the Sasanian Empire.

==== Execution of Khosrow II ====
Khosrow II was executed in 628 and, as a result, there were numerous claimants to the throne; from 628 to 632 there were ten kings and queens of Persia. The last, Yazdegerd III, was a grandson of Khosrow II and was said to be a mere child aged 8 years.

==== Muhammad's Letter ====
After the Treaty of Hudaybiyyah in 628, Islamic tradition holds that Muhammad sent many letters to the princes, kings, and chiefs of the various tribes and kingdoms of the time, exhorting them to convert to Islam and bow to the order of God. These letters were carried by ambassadors to Persia, Byzantium, Ethiopia, Egypt, Yemen, and the city of Al-Hirah in Iraq on the same day. This assertion has been brought under scrutiny by some modern historians of Islam—notably Grimme and Caetani. Particularly in dispute is the assertion that Khosrow II received a letter from Muhammad, as the Sassanid court ceremony was notoriously intricate, and it is unlikely that a letter from what at the time was a minor regional power would have reached the hands of the Shahanshah.

With regards to Persia, Muslim histories further recount that at the beginning of the seventh year of migration, Muhammad appointed one of his officers, Abd Allah ibn Hudhafa, to carry his letter to Khosrow II inviting him to convert:

In the name of God, the Beneficent, the Merciful. From Muhammad, the Messenger of God, to the great Kisra of Persia. Peace be upon him, who seeks truth and expresses belief in God and in His Prophet and testifies that there are no gods but one God whom has no partners, and who believes that Muhammad is His servant and Prophet. Under the Command of God, I invite you to Him. He has sent me for the guidance of all people so that I may warn them all of His wrath and may present the unbelievers with an ultimatum. Embrace Islam so that you may remain safe. And if you refuse to accept Islam, you will be responsible for the sins of the Magi.

There are differing accounts of the reaction of Khosrow II. According to tradition, the letter was sent through Abd Allah ibn Hudhafa who, through the governor of Bahrain, delivered it to the Khosrow. Upon reading it Khosrow II reportedly tore up the document, saying, "A pitiful slave among my subjects dares to write his name before mine" and wrote to Badhan, his vassal ruler of Yemen: “It has reached my ears that a person has claimed Prophethood in Hijaz. Arrange to send two brave and courageous persons to him so that they may bring him to me as a captive.” When Abd Allah ibn Hudhafa told Muhammad how Khosrow had torn his letter to pieces, Muhammad is said to have stated, "May God [likewise] tear apart his kingdom," while reacting to the Caesar's behavior saying, "May God preserve his kingdom." when the soldiers arrived, they informed him of what they were ordered to do. after some talks Muhammad asked them to wait till the following day when he was to meet them again. In the meantime, Muslims attest that Mohammad received information through the angel Gabriel (Jabra’il) that Allah had caused Khosrow Parviz to be killed by Shirweih, his own son, giving him the exact time of night and the date when Khosrow Parviz was killed in Persia. After this event, Badhan accepted islam through this supposed miracle.

=== Military ===
Years of warfare between the Sasanians and the Byzantines, as well as the strain of the Khazar invasion of Transcaucasia, had exhausted the army. No effective ruler followed Khosrow II, causing chaos in society and problems in the provincial administration, until Yazdegerd III rose to power. All these factors undermined the strength of the Persian army. Yazdegerd III was merely 8 years old when he came to the throne and, lacking experience, did not try to rebuild the army. The Sasanian Empire was highly decentralized, and was in fact a "confederation" with the Parthians, who themselves retained a high level of independence. After the last Sasanian-Byzantine war, the Parthians wanted to withdraw from the confederation, and the Sasanians were thus ill-prepared and ill-equipped to mount an effective and cohesive defense against the Muslim armies. Moreover, the powerful northern and eastern Parthian families, the Kust-i Khwarasan and Kust-i Adurbadagan, withdrew to their respective strongholds and made peace with the Arabs, refusing to fight alongside the Sasanians.

Pourshariati argues that the Arab conquest of Mesopotamia "took place, not, as has been conventionally believed, in the years 632–634, after the accession of the last Sasanian king Yazdegerd III (632–651) to power, but in the period from 628 to 632." An important consequence of this change in timeline means that the Arab conquest started precisely when the Sasanians and Parthians were engaged in internecine warfare over who was to succeed the Sasanian throne.

When Arab squadrons made their first raids into Sasanian territory, Yazdegerd III did not consider them a threat, and he refused to send an army to encounter the invaders. When the main Arab army reached the Persian borders, Yazdegerd III procrastinated in dispatching an army against the Arabs. Even Rostam Farrokhzad, who was both Eran Spahbod and Viceroy, did not see the Arabs as a threat. Without opposition, the Arabs had time to consolidate and fortify their positions.

When hostilities between the Sasanians and the Arabs finally began, the Persian army faced fundamental problems. While their heavy cavalry had proved effective against the Roman forces, it was too slow and regimented to act with full force against the agile and unpredictable lightly armed Arab cavalry and foot archers.

The Persian army had a few initial successes. War elephants temporarily halted the Arab army, but when Arab veterans returned from the Syrian fronts, where they had been fighting against Byzantine forces, they provided crucial instruction on how to effectively counter the war elephants.

These factors contributed to the decisive Sassanid defeat at the Battle of al-Qādisiyyah. The Persians, who had only one generation before conquered Egypt and Asia Minor, lost decisive battles when nimble, lightly armed Arabs accustomed to skirmishes and desert warfare attacked them. The Arab squadrons defeated the Persian army in several more battles culminating in the Battle of Nahāvand, the last major battle of the Sassanids. The Sassanid dynasty came to an end with the death of Yazdegerd III in 651.

== Succession of Muhammad ==
When Muhammad died in June 632, Abu Bakr took the title of Caliph and political successor at Medina. Soon after Abu Bakr's succession, several Arab tribes revolted, in the Ridda Wars (Arabic for the Wars of Apostasy). The Ridda Wars preoccupied the Caliphate until March 633, and ended with the entirety of the Arab Peninsula under the authority of the Caliph at Medina.

Abu Bakr set in motion a historical trajectory (continued later by Umar and Uthman) that in a few decades led to one of the largest empires in history, beginning with a confrontation with the Sassanid Empire under the general Khalid ibn al-Walid.

== Conquest of Mesopotamia (633–638) ==
=== First invasion (633) ===
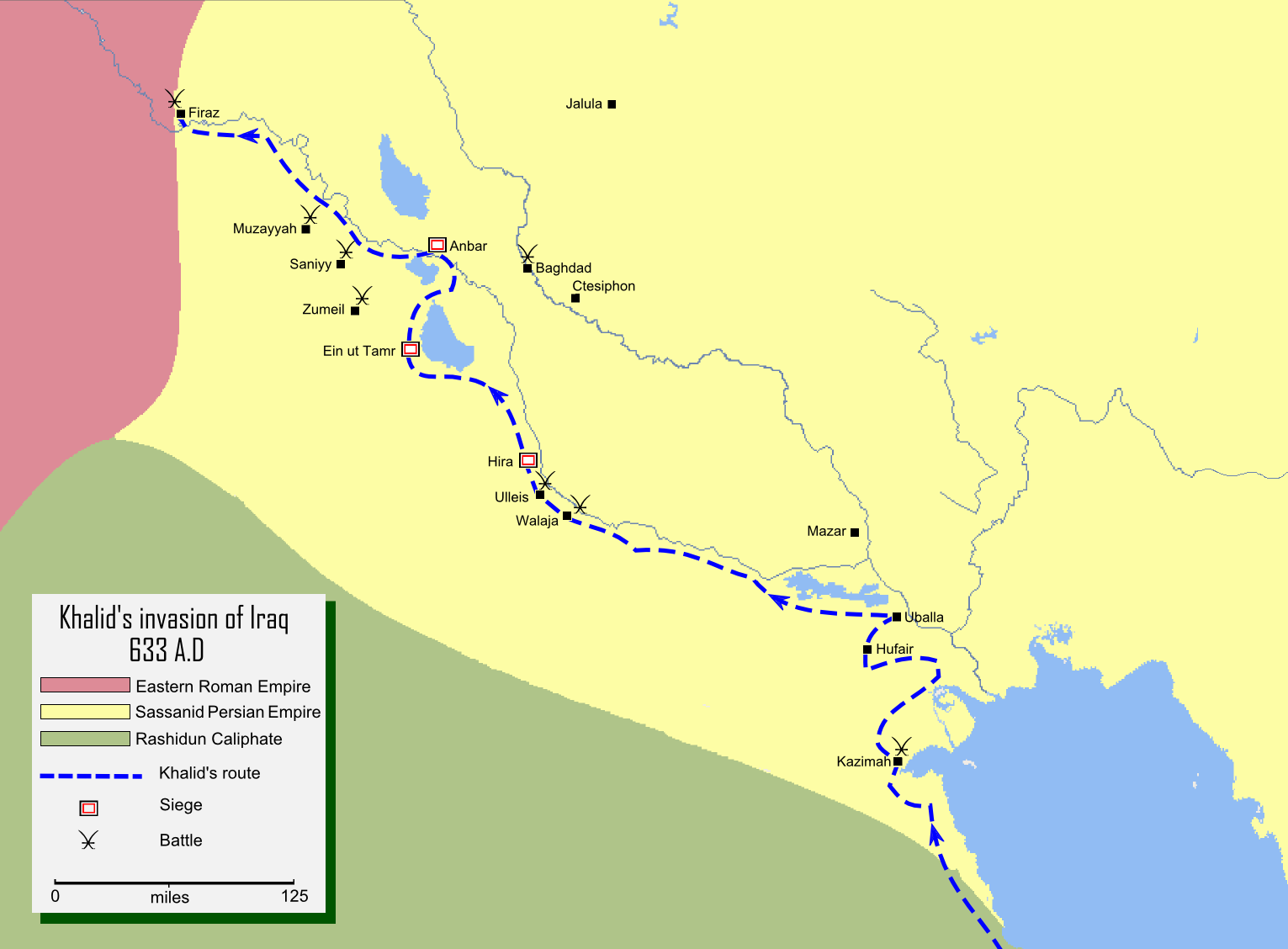
Map detailing the route of Khalid ibn al-Walid's conquest of Mesopotamia

After the Ridda wars, a tribal chief of northeastern Arabia, Al-Muthanna ibn Haritha, raided the Sasanian towns in Mesopotamia, actions that generated a considerable amount of booty was collected. Al-Muthanna ibn Haritha went to Medina to inform Abu Bakr about his success and was appointed commander of his people, after which he began to raid deeper into Mesopotamia. Using the mobility of his light cavalry, he could easily raid any town near the desert and disappear again into the desert, beyond the reach of the Sasanian army. Al-Muthanna's acts made Abu Bakr think about the expansion of the Rashidun Caliphate.

To ensure victory, Abu Bakr used a volunteer army and put his best general, Khalid ibn al-Walid, in command. After defeating the self-proclaimed prophet Musaylimah in the Battle of Yamama, Khalid was still at Al-Yamama when Abu Bakr ordered him to invade the Sasanian Empire. Making Al-Hirah the objective of Khalid, Abu Bakr sent reinforcements and ordered the tribal chiefs of northeastern Arabia, Al-Muthanna ibn Haritha, Mazhur ibn Adi, Harmala and Sulma to operate under Khalid's command. Around the third week of March 633 (first week of Muharram 12th Hijrah) Khalid set out from Al-Yamama with an army of 10,000. The tribal chiefs, with 2,000 warriors each, joined him, swelling his ranks to 18,000. After entering Mesopotamia, he dispatched messages to every governor and deputy who ruled the provinces calling on them to either embrace Islam or pay tribute. Khalid did not receive any responses and continued with his tactical plans.

Khalid went on to win decisive victories in four consecutive battles: the Battle of Chains, fought in April; the Battle of River, fought in the third week of April; the Battle of Walaja the following month (where he successfully used a double envelopment manoeuvre), and the Battle of Ullais, fought in mid-May. The Persian court, already disturbed by internal problems, was thrown into chaos. In the last week of May, the important city of Al-Hirah fell to the Muslims. After resting his armies, in June, Khalid laid siege to the city of al-Anbar, which surrendered in July. Khalid then moved south, and conquered the city of Ayn al-Tamr in the last week of July. At this point, most of what is now Iraq was under Islamic control.

Khalid received a call for aid from northern Arabia at Dawmat al-Jandal, where another Muslim Arab general, Iyad ibn Ghanm, was trapped among the rebel tribes. Khalid went there and defeated the rebels in the Battle of Dawmat al-Jandal in the last week of August. Upon his return, he received news of the assembling of a large Persian army. He decided to defeat them all separately to avoid the risk of being defeated by a large unified Persian army. Four divisions of Persian and Christian Arab auxiliaries were present at Hanafiz, Zumiel, Sanni and Muzieh. Khalid divided his army into three units, and employed them in well-coordinated attacks against the Persians from three different sides at night, in the Battle of Muzayyah, then the Battle of Saniyy, and finally the Battle of Zumail, all during the month of November. These devastating defeats ended Persian control over Mesopotamia, and left the Persian capital Ctesiphon vulnerable. Before attacking Ctesiphon, Khalid decided to eliminate all Persian forces in the south and west. He accordingly marched against the border city of Firaz, where he allegedly defeated the combined forces of the Sasanian Persians, the Byzantines and Christian Arabs in December. However this has been disputed, as there is doubt to any large-scale Persian forces, and the suspect elements of the battle including casualty numbers and a lack of names of allied commanders point to an Islamic cover-up, which may have in fact been a defeat of Khalid. This battle was the last in his conquest of Mesopotamia. While Khalid was on his way to attack Qadissiyah (a key fort en route to Ctesiphon), Abu Bakr ordered him to the Roman front in Syria to assume command there.

=== Second invasion (634–636) ===
==== Battle of the Bridge ====
According to the will of Abu Bakr, Umar was to continue the conquest of Syria and Mesopotamia. On the northeastern borders of the Empire, in Mesopotamia, the situation was rapidly deteriorating. During Abu Bakr's era, Khalid ibn al-Walid had left Mesopotamia with half his army of 9,000 soldiers to assume command in Syria, whereupon the Persians decided to take back their lost territory. The Muslim army was forced to leave the conquered areas and concentrate on the border. Umar immediately sent reinforcements to aid Muthanna ibn Haritha in Mesopotamia under the command of Abu Ubaid al-Thaqafi. At that time, a series of battles between the Persians and Arabs occurred in the region of Sawad, such as Namaraq, Kaskar and Baqusiatha, in which the Arabs managed to maintain their presence in the area. Later on, the Persians defeated Abu Ubaid in the Battle of the Bridge. Al-Muthanna ibn Haritha was later victorious in the Battle of Buwayb. In 635 Yazdegerd III sought an alliance with Emperor Heraclius of the Eastern Roman Empire, marrying the latter's daughter (or, by some traditions, his granddaughter) in order to seal the arrangement. While Heraclius prepared for a major offence in the Levant, Yazdegerd ordered the concentration of massive armies to push the Muslims out of Mesopotamia for good through a series of well-coordinated attacks on two fronts.

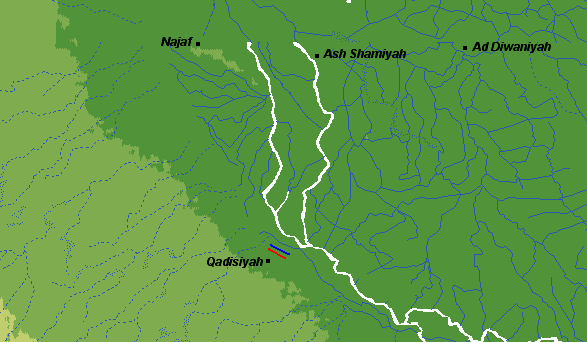
The site of the Battle of Qadisiyyah, showing Muslim army (in red) and Sasanian army (in blue)

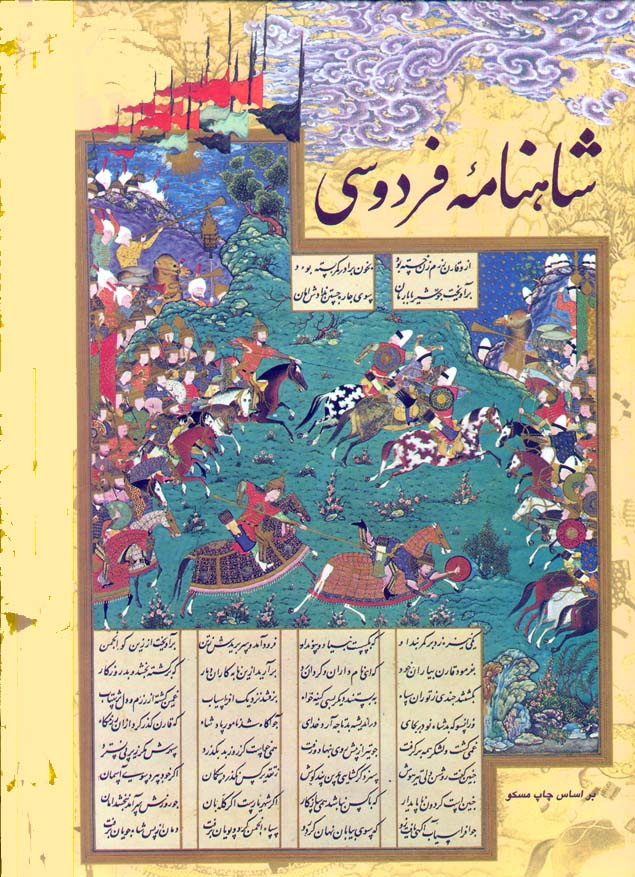
Battle of Qadisiyyah from a manuscript of the Shahnameh

==== Battle of Qadisiyyah ====
Umar ordered his army to retreat to the Arabian border and began raising armies at Medina for another campaign into Mesopotamia. Owing to the critical situation, Umar wished to command the army personally, but the members of Majlis al-Shura demurred, claiming that the two-front war required Umar's presence in Medina. Accordingly, Umar appointed Sa'd ibn Abi Waqqas, a respected senior officer, even though Sa'd was suffering from sciatica. Sa'd left Medina with his army in May 636 and arrived at Qadisiyyah in June.

While Heraclius launched his offensive in May 636, Yazdegerd was unable to muster his armies in time to provide the Byzantines with Persian support. Umar, allegedly aware of this alliance and not wanting to risk a battle with two great powers simultaneously, quickly reinforced the Muslim army at Yarmouk to engage and defeat the Byzantines. Meanwhile, he ordered Sa'd to enter into peace negotiations with Yazdegerd III and invite him to convert to Islam to prevent Persian forces from taking the field. Heraclius instructed his general Vahan not to engage in battle with the Muslims before receiving explicit orders. Fearing more Arab reinforcements, Vahan attacked the Muslim army in the Battle of Yarmouk in August 636, and was routed.

With the Byzantine threat ended, the Sasanian Empire was still a formidable power with vast manpower reserves, and the Arabs soon found themselves confronting a huge Persian army with troops drawn from every corner of the empire, including war elephants, and commanded by its foremost generals. Within three months, Sa'd defeated the Persian army in the Battle of al-Qādisiyyah, effectively ending Sasanian rule west of Persia proper. This victory is largely regarded as a decisive turning point in Islam's growth: with the bulk of Persian forces defeated, Sa'd with his companions later conquered Babylon, Kūthā, Sābāṭ (Valashabad) and Bahurasīr (Veh-Ardashir). Ctesiphon, the capital of the Sassanid Empire, fell in March 637 after a siege of three months.

=== Final campaign and conquest (636–638) ===
In December 636, Umar ordered Utba ibn Ghazwan to head south to capture al-Ubulla (known as "port of Apologos" in the Periplus of the Erythraean Sea) and Basra, in order to cut ties between the Persian garrison there and Ctesiphon. Utba ibn Ghazwan arrived in April 637, and captured the region. The Persians withdrew to the Maysan region, which the Muslims seized later as well.

After the conquest of Ctesiphon, several detachments were immediately sent west to capture Circesium and Heet, both forts at the Byzantine border. Several fortified Persian armies were still active north-east of Ctesiphon at Jalawla and north of the Tigris at Tikrit and Mosul.

After withdrawal from Ctesiphon, the Persian armies gathered at Jalawla, a place of strategic importance due to routes leading from here to Mesopotamia, Khurasan and Azerbaijan. The Persian forces at Jalawla were commanded by Mihran. His deputy was Farrukhzad, a brother of Rustam, who had commanded the Persian forces at the Battle of al-Qadisiyyah. Umar decided to deal with Jalawla first, thereby clearing the way to the north, before taking any decisive action against Tikrit and Mosul. Umar appointed Hashim ibn Utba to take Jalawla and Abdullah ibn Muta'am to conquer Tikrit and Mosul. In April 637, Hashim led 12,000 troops from Ctesiphon to win a victory over the Persians at the Battle of Jalawla. He then laid siege to Jalawla for seven months, ending in the city's capture. Then, Abdullah ibn Muta'am marched against Tikrit and captured the city with the help of Christians, after fierce resistance. He next sent an army to Mosul which surrendered on the condition of paying Jizya. With victory at Jalawla and occupation of the Tikrit-Mosul region, the whole of Mesopotamia was under Muslim control.

Thereafter, a Muslim force under Qa'qa marched in pursuit of the escaping Persians at Khaniqeen, 25 kilometres (15 mi) from Jalawla on the road to Iran, still under the command of Mihran. Qa'qa defeated the Persian forces in the Battle of Khaniqeen and captured the city. The Persians then withdrew to Hulwan. Qa'qa followed and laid siege to the city, which was captured in January 638. Qa'qa sought permission to operate deeper in Persia, but Umar rejected the proposal, writing in response:

I wish that between the Suwad and the Persian hills there were walls which would prevent them from getting to us, and prevent us from getting to them. The fertile Suwad is sufficient for us; and I prefer the safety of the Muslims to the spoils of war.

== Persian raids in Mesopotamia (638–641) ==
By February 638, there was a lull in the fighting on the Persian front. The Suwad, the Tigris valley, and the Euphrates valley were now under complete Muslim control. The Persians had withdrawn to Persia proper, east of the Zagros mountains. The Persians continued raiding Mesopotamia, which remained politically unstable. It seemed the Zagros range was the dividing line between the Rashidun Caliphate and the Sassanids. In the latter part of 638, Hormuzan, who was one of the seven great chiefs of Persia, and had commanded a corps at the Battle of Qadisiyyah, intensified his raids in Mesopotamia. Sa'd, on Umar's instructions, attacked Hormuzan, while Utba ibn Ghazwan, aided by Nouman ibn Muqarin, attacked Ahvaz and forced Hormuzan into a peace treaty, under which Ahvaz would remain in Hormuzan's possession as a Muslim vassal state and would pay tribute. Hormuzan broke the treaty, leading Umar to send Abu Musa al-Ash'ari, governor of Basra, to deal with him. After another defeat, Hormuzan signed another treaty on similar terms to the last. This peace also proved short-lived once Hormuzan was reinforced by fresh Persian troops sent by Emperor Yazdegerd III in late 640. The troops concentrated at Tuster, north of Ahvaz. Umar sent the Governor of Kufa, Ammar ibn Yasir, the governor of Basra, Abu Musa, and Nouman ibn Muqarin there, where Hormuzan was defeated, captured and sent to Umar in Medina. Hormuzan apparently converted to Islam and remained a useful adviser to Umar throughout the remainder of the Persian campaign. He is also believed to be the mastermind behind Umar's assassination in 644.

After the victory at Tustar, Abu Musa marched against the strategically important Susa in January 641, capturing it after a siege of a couple of months. Next, Abu Musa marched against Junde Sabur, the only place left of military importance in the Persian province of Khuzistan, which surrendered to the Muslims after a siege of a few weeks.

== Battle of Nahavand (642) ==
After the conquest of Khuzestan, Umar wanted peace. Though considerably weakened, the image of the Persian Empire as a fearsome superpower still resonated in the minds of the newly-ascendant Arabs, and Umar was wary of unnecessary military engagement with it, preferring to leave the rump of the Persian Empire alone, commenting, "I wish there was a mountain of fire between us and the Persians, so that neither they could get to us, nor we to them." Persian pride was hurt by the Arab conquest, making the status quo intolerable.

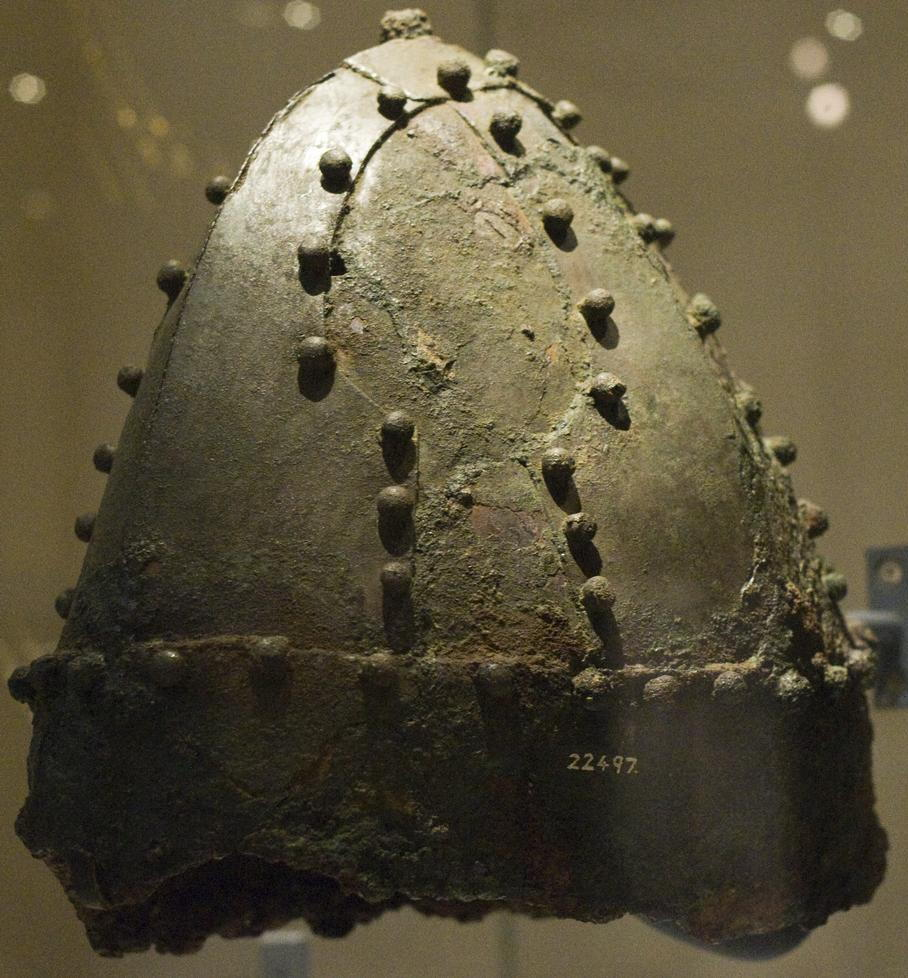
A Sasanian army helmet.

After the defeat of the Persian forces at the Battle of Jalula in 637, Yazdegerd III went to Rey and from there moved to Merv, where he set up his capital and directed his chiefs to conduct continuous raids in Mesopotamia. Within four years, Yazdegerd III felt powerful enough to challenge the Muslims again for control of Mesopotamia. Accordingly, he recruited 100,000 hardened veterans and young volunteers from all parts of Persia, under the command of Mardan Shah, which marched to Nahavand for the last titanic struggle with the Caliphate.

The Governor of Kufa, Ammar ibn Yasir, received intelligence of the Persian movements and concentration at Nahavand and reported them to Umar. Although Umar had expressed a desire for Mesopotamia to be his easternmost frontier, the concentration of the Persian army at Nahavand forced him to act. He now believed that as long as Persia proper remained under Sasanian rule, the raids into Mesopotamia would continue. Hudhayfah ibn al-Yaman was appointed commander of the forces of Kufa, and was ordered to march to Nahavand. Abu Musa was to march to Nahavand from Basra, while Al-Nu'man ibn Muqarrin marched from Ctesiphon. Umar decided to personally take the army concentrated at Medina to Nahavand to assume overall command. The members of the Majlis al-Shura suggested that Umar should command the campaign from Medina, appointing an astute field commander for Nahavand. Umar acquiesced, appointing Al-Mughira ibn Shu'ba as commander of the forces concentrated at Medina, and Nouman ibn Muqarrin as commander-in-chief at Nahavand. The Muslim army first concentrated at Tazar, and then defeated the Persians at the Battle of Nahavand in December 642. Al-Nu'man died in the action, and, as per Umar's instructions, Hudhayfah ibn al-Yaman became the new commander-in-chief. Thereafter, the Muslims captured the whole district of Hamadan, encountering only feeble resistance.

== Preparation for the conquest of Persia ==
After several years, Caliph Umar adopted a new offensive policy, preparing to launch a full-scale invasion of what remained of the Sasanian Empire. The Battle of Nahavand was one of the most decisive battles in Islamic history and proved to be the key to Persia. After the devastating defeat at Nahavand, the last Sassanid emperor, Yazdegerd III, fled to different parts of Persia to raise a new army, with limited success, while Umar attempted to capture him.

Umar decided to strike the Persians immediately after their defeat at Nahavand, while he still possessed a psychological advantage. Umar had to decide which of three provinces to conquer first: Fars in the south, Azerbaijan in the north or Isfahan in the center. Umar chose Isfahan, as it was the heart of the Persian Empire and a conduit for supply and communications among the Sasanian garrisons, and its capture would isolate Fars and Azerbaijan from Khorasan, Yazdegerd's stronghold. After he had taken Fars and Isfahan, the next attacks would be simultaneously launched against Azerbaijan, the northwestern province, and Sistan, the easternmost province of the Persian Empire. The conquest of those provinces would leave Khorasan isolated and vulnerable, the last stage of the conquest of Sasanian Persia.

Preparations were complete by January 642. The success of the plan depended upon how effectively Umar could coordinate these attacks from Medina, about 1,500 kilometers from Persia, and upon the skill of his field commanders. Umar adopted a different approach to the command structure. Instead of appointing a single field commander to press the campaign, Umar appointed several commanders, each assigned a different mission. Once a commander's mission ended, he would become an ordinary soldier under the new field commander for the latter's mission. The purpose of this strategy was to allow commanders to mix with their soldiers and to remind them that they are like everyone else: command is only given to the most competent, and, once the battle is over, the commander returns to his previous position.

On the eve of the campaign, Umar, in order to boost morale, decided to reinstall Khalid as field commander, four years after his dismissal. Khalid's reputation as the conqueror of the Eastern Roman provinces demoralized the Persian commanders, most of whom had already been defeated by him during his conquest of Mesopotamia in 633. Before Umar could issue the reappointment order, Khalid died in Emesa.

Throughout the Persian campaign, Umar even appointed the commanders of the wings, the center and the cavalry of the army. Umar strictly instructed his commanders to consult him before making any decisive move in Persia. All the commanders, before starting their assigned campaigns, were instructed to send a detailed report of the geography and terrain of the region and the positions of the Persian garrisons, forts, cities and troops. Umar then would send them a detailed plan of how he wanted the region to be captured. Only the tactical issues were left to the field commanders to tackle in accordance with the situation they faced at their fronts. Umar appointed the best available and well-reputed commanders for the campaign.

== Conquest of Central Iran ==
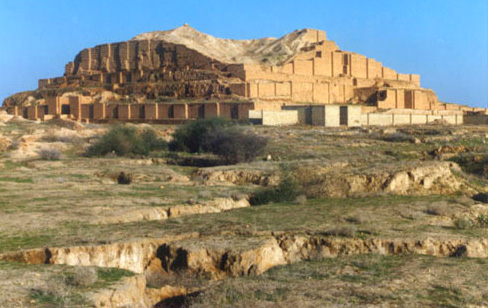
The ziggurat of Choqa Zanbil in Khuzestan

In the wake of Khalid's demise, Umar appointed Abdullah ibn Uthman as commander of the Muslim forces for the invasion of Isfahan. From Nahavand, Al-Nu'man ibn Muqarrin marched to Hamadan, and then proceeded 370 kilometres (230 mi) southeast to the city of Isfahan, defeating a Sasanian army there. The Sasanian commander, Shahrvaraz Jadhuyih, along with another Sasanian general, was killed during the battle. Nu'man, reinforced by fresh troops from Basra and Kufa under the command of Abu Musa al-Ash'ari and Al-Ahnaf ibn Qays, then besieged the city. The siege continued for a few months before the city surrendered.

In 651, Nu'aym ibn Muqarrin, al-Nu'man's brother, marched northeast to Rey, Iran, about 320 kilometres (200 mi) from Hamadan, and laid siege to the city, which surrendered after fierce resistance. Nu'aym then marched 240 kilometres (150 mi) northeast toward Qom, which was captured without much resistance. This represented the boundary of the Isfahan region. Further northeast was Khurasan, and southeast lay Sistan. Meanwhile, Hamadan and Rey had rebelled. Umar sent Nu'aym, whose brother Nu'man had recently died, to Hamadan to crush the rebellion and clear Isfahan's western frontier. Nu'aym recaptured Hamadan after a bloody battle, and then proceeded to Rey. There too the Persians resisted but were defeated outside the fort, and the Muslims recaptured the city. The Persian citizens sued for peace, agreeing to pay the Jizya. From Rey, Nu'aym moved north to Tabaristan, south of the Caspian Sea. The ruler of Tabaristan then signed a peace treaty with the Caliphate.

== Conquest of Fars ==
=== First Muslim invasion and the successful Sasanian counter-attack ===
The Muslim invasion of Fars began in 638/9, when the Rashidun governor of Bahrain, al-Ala ibn al-Hadrami, having defeated some rebellious Arab tribes, seized an island in the Persian Gulf. Although al-Ala and the rest of the Arabs had been ordered to not invade Fars or its surrounding islands, he and his men continued their raids into the province. Al-'Ala quickly prepared an army which he divided into three groups, one under al-Jarud ibn Mu'alla, the second under al-Sawwar ibn Hammam, and the third under Khulayd ibn al-Mundhir ibn Sawa.

When the first group entered Fars, it was quickly defeated and al-Jarud was killed. The same thing soon happened to the second group. Khulayd and the third group kept the defenders at bay, but were blocked from withdrawing to Bahrain by the Sasanians. Umar, having found out about al-Ala's invasion of Fars, had him replaced with Sa'd ibn Abi Waqqas as governor. Umar then ordered Utba ibn Ghazwan to send reinforcements to Khulayd. Once the reinforcements arrived, Khulayd and some of his men managed to withdraw to Bahrain, while the rest withdrew to Basra.

=== Second and last Muslim invasion ===
In c. 643, Uthman ibn Abi al-As seized Bishapur, which signed a peace treaty. In 644, al-Ala once again attacked Fars from Bahrain, reaching as far as Estakhr, until he was repulsed by the Persian governor (marzban) of Fars, Shahrag. Some time later, Uthman ibn Abi al-As managed to establish a military base at Tawwaj, and soon defeated and killed Shahrag near Rew-shahr. Persian convert to Islam, Hormoz ibn Hayyan al-'Abdi, was then sent by Uthman ibn Abi al-As to attack a fortress known as Senez on the coast of Fars. After the accession of Uthman ibn Affan as the new Rashidun Caliph on 11 November, the inhabitants of Bishapur, under the leadership of Shahrag's brother, declared independence, but were defeated. The Persian historian al-Baladhuri said this occurred in 646.

In 648, 'Abd Allah ibn al-'Ash'ari forced the governor of Estakhr, Mahak, to surrender the city. Its citizens rebelled in 649/650 while its newly appointed governor, Abd Allah ibn Amir, was trying to capture Gor. The military governor of Estakhr, 'Ubayd Allah ibn Ma'mar, was defeated and killed. In 650/651, Yazdegerd went there to plan an organized resistance against the Arabs, and, after some time, went to Gor. Estakhr put up a weak resistance and was soon sacked by the Arabs, who killed over 40,000 defenders. The Arabs then quickly seized Gor, Kazerun and Siraf, while Yazdegerd fled to Kerman. Muslim control of Fars remained shaky for a time, with several local rebellions following the conquest.

== Conquest of Kerman, Sakastan and the Caucasus ==
=== Conquest of Kerman ===
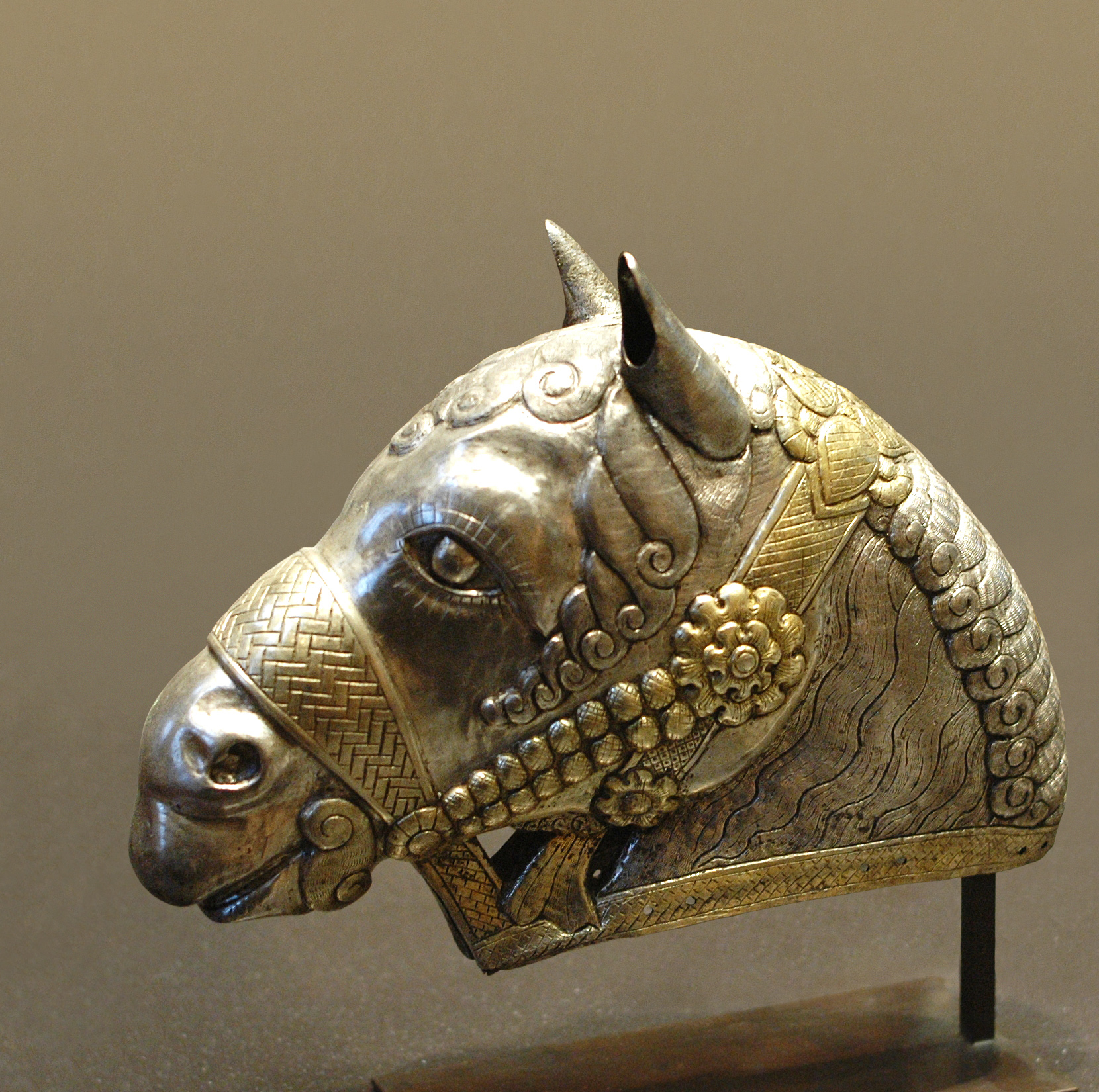
Sassanid era horse head found in Kerman

The expedition to Kerman, under Suhail ibn Adi, was sent at roughly the same time as the expeditions to Sistan and Azerbaijan. Suhail marched from Basra in 643; passing through Shiraz and Persepolis, he joined with other armies and then marched against Kerman, which was subdued after a pitched battle with the local garrisons.

=== Conquest of Sakastan ===
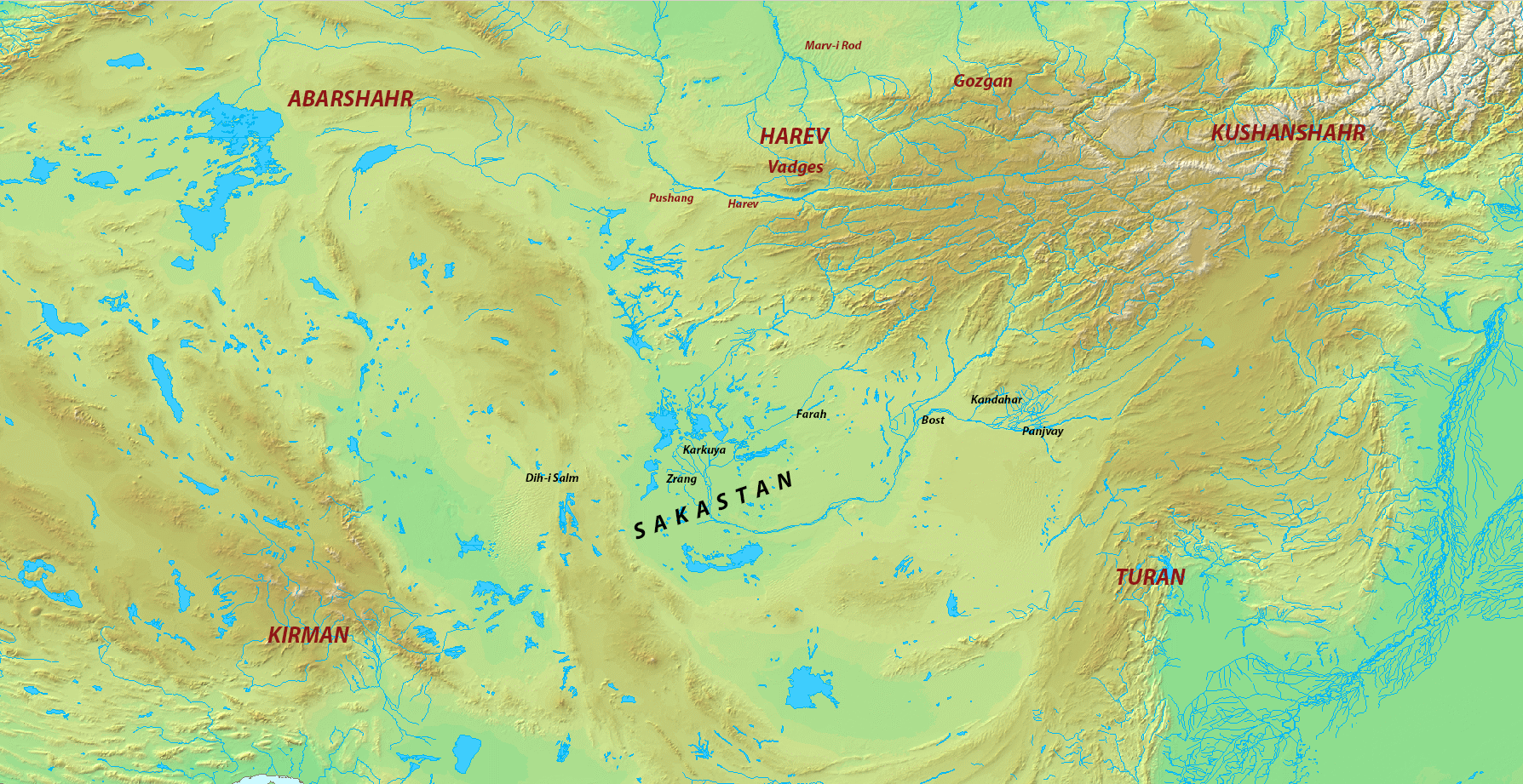
Map of Sakastan under the Sasanians

The Arabs were raiding Sakastan as early as Umar's caliphate. The first real invasion took place in 650, when Abd Allah ibn Amir, having secured his position in Kerman, sent an army under Mujashi ibn Mas'ud there. After crossing the Dasht-i Lut desert, Mujashi ibn Mas'ud reached Sakastan, but suffered a heavy defeat and was forced to retreat.

One year later, Abd Allah ibn Amir sent an army under Rabi ibn Ziyad al-Harithi to Sakastan. After some time, Rabi reached Zaliq, a Sakastani border town, where he forced the dehqan of the town to acknowledge Rashidun authority. He then did the same at the fortress of Karkuya, which had a famous fire temple mentioned in the Tarikh-i Sistan. He then seized more land in the province. Next, he besieged the provincial capital, Zrang, and, after a heavy battle outside the city, its governor, Aparviz, surrendered. When Aparviz went to Rabi ibn Ziyad to negotiate a treaty, he saw that Rabi was using the bodies of two dead soldiers as a chair. This horrified Aparviz, who, in order to spare the inhabitants of Sakastan from the Arabs, made peace with them in return for a heavy tribute of 1 million dirhams, including 1,000 slave boys (or girls) bearing 1,000 golden vessels. Rabi ibn Ziyad was then appointed governor of the province.

Eighteen months later, Rabi was summoned to Basra, and was replaced by 'Abd al-Rahman ibn Samura. The inhabitants of Sakastan used this opportunity to rebel, defeating the Muslim garrison at Zrang. When 'Abd al-Rahman ibn Samura reached Sakastan, he suppressed the rebellion and defeated the Zunbils of Zabulistan, seizing Bust and a few cities in Zabulistan.

=== Conquest of Iranian Azerbaijan ===
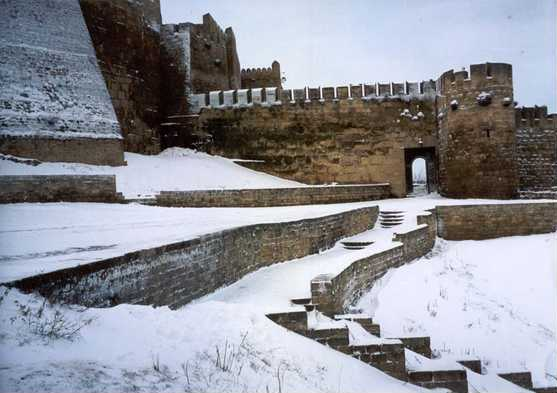
Sassanid fortress in Derbent, present day Dagestan, Russia. It fell to the Muslims in 643.

The conquest of Iranian Azerbaijan started in 651, part of a simultaneous attack launched against Kerman and Makran in the southeast (described above), against Sistan in the northeast and against Azerbaijan in the northwest. Hudhayfah ibn al-Yaman was assigned Azerbaijan. Hudhayfah marched from Rey in central Persia to Zanjan, a well-fortified Persian stronghold in the north. The Persians came out of the city and gave battle, but Hudhayfah defeated them, captured the city, and those who sought peace were granted it on the usual jizya conditions. From Zanjan, Hudhayfah marched to Ardabil which surrendered peacefully. Hudhayfah then continued his march north along the western coast of the Caspian Sea and captured Bab al-Abwab by force. At this point Hudhayfah was recalled by Uthman, to be replaced by Bukayr ibn Abdallah and Utba ibn Farqad. They were sent to carry out a two-pronged attack against Azerbaijan: Bukayr along the western coast of the Caspian Sea, and Utba into the heart of Azerbaijan. On his way north Bukayr was halted by a large Persian force under Isfandiyar, the son of Farrukhzad. A pitched battle was fought, after which Isfandiyar was defeated and captured. In return for his life, he agreed to surrender his estates in Azerbaijan and persuade others to submit to Muslim rule. Uthba ibn Farqad then defeated Bahram, brother of Isfandiyar. He too sued for peace. Azerbaijan then surrendered to Caliph Umar, agreeing to pay the annual jizya.

=== Conquest of Eastern Armenia ===
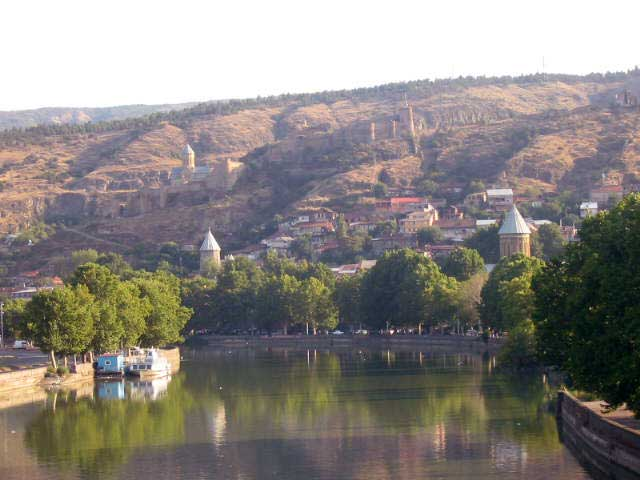
View of Tbilisi, which fell to the Rashidun Caliphate in 644.

The Muslims had conquered Byzantine Armenia in 638–639. Sasanian Armenia, remained in Iranian hands, along with Khorasan. Umar refused to take any chances; he did not consider the Persians weak, which facilitated the speedy conquest of the Persian Empire. Again Umar sent simultaneous expeditions to the far north-east and north-west of the Persian Empire, one to Khorasan in late 643 and the other to Armenia. Bukayr ibn Abdallah was ordered to capture Tiflis. From Bab, on the western coast of the Caspian Sea, Bukayr continued his march north. Umar employed his traditional successful strategy of multi-pronged attacks. While Bukayr was still kilometres away from Tiflis, Umar instructed him to divide his army into three corps. Umar appointed Habib ibn Maslama to capture Tiflis, Abd al-Rahman to march north against the mountains and Hudhayfah to march against the southern mountains. With the success of all three missions, the advance into Armenia came to an end with the death of Umar in November 644. By then almost the whole of the South Caucasus was captured.

== Conquest of Khorasan ==
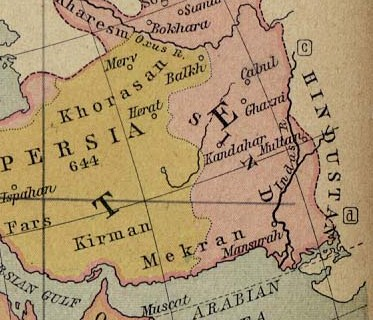

Khorasan was the second-largest province of the Sasanian Empire. It stretched from what is now northeastern Iran, northwestern Afghanistan and southern Turkmenistan. In 651 the conquest of Khurasan was assigned to Ahnaf ibn Qais. Ahnaf marched from Kufa and took a short and less frequented route via Rey and Nishapur. Rey was already in Muslim hands and Nishapur surrendered without resistance. From Nishapur, Ahnaf marched to Herat in western Afghanistan. Herat was a fortified town, and the resulting siege lasted for a few months before it surrendered, bringing the whole of southern Khorasan under Muslim control. Ahnaf then marched north directly to Merv, in present-day Turkmenistan. Merv was the capital of Khurasan and here Yazdegred III held his court. On hearing of the Muslim advance, Yazdegerd III left for Balkh. No resistance was offered at Merv, and the Muslims occupied the capital of Khurasan without a fight. Ahnaf stayed at Merv and waited for reinforcement from Kufa. Meanwhile, Yazdegerd had also gathered considerable power at Balkh and allied with the Turkic Khan of Farghana, who personally led the relief contingent. Umar ordered Ahnaf to break up the alliance. The Khan of Farghana, realizing that fighting against the Muslims might endanger his own kingdom, withdrew from the alliance and pulled back to Farghana. The remainder of Yazdegerd's army was defeated at the Battle of Oxus River and retreated across the Oxus to Transoxiana. Yazdegerd himself narrowly escaped to China. The Muslims had now reached the outermost frontiers of Persia. Beyond that lay the lands of the Turks and still further lay China. Ahnaf returned to Merv and sent a detailed report of his success to the anxiously waiting Umar, and sought permission to cross the Oxus river and invade Transoxiana. Umar ordered Ahnaf to stand down and instead consolidate his power south of the Oxus.

== Sasanian rebellion ==
Umar was assassinated in November 644 by an Iranian slave named Abu Lu'lu'a Firuz – in some narrations a former Sasanian solidarity soldier – after Umar allegedly refused to lift a tax imposed upon the latter. Soon after, Abu Lu'lu'a's was either executed or committed suicide. The incident spurred Ubayd Allah, one of Umar's sons, to also kill Hurmuzān, an ex-Sasanian military officer who had been working for Umar as an adviser after his capture – acting upon a claim that Hurmuzan had been seen conspiring with Abu Lu'lu'a while he was holding the murder weapon.

Uthman ibn Affan (644–656) succeeded Umar as caliph. During his reign, almost the whole of the former Sassanid empire's territory rebelled from time to time, requiring him to send several military expeditions to crush the rebellions and recapture Persia and its vassal states. The main rebellions were in the Persian provinces of Armenia and Azerbaijan in 646, Fars and Sistan in 649, Makran in 650, and Khorasan in 651. Finally, in 651, Yazdegerd III, the last Sassanid emperor, was killed near Merv by a local miller for his purse, thus putting an end to both his dynasty and to organized Persian resistance. Meanwhile, Uthman's empire expanded beyond the borders of the Sasanian Empire, to Transoxiana, Baluchistan, and the Caucasus. For many decades to come, this was the easternmost limit of Muslim rule.

== Persia under Muslim rule ==
=== Administration ===
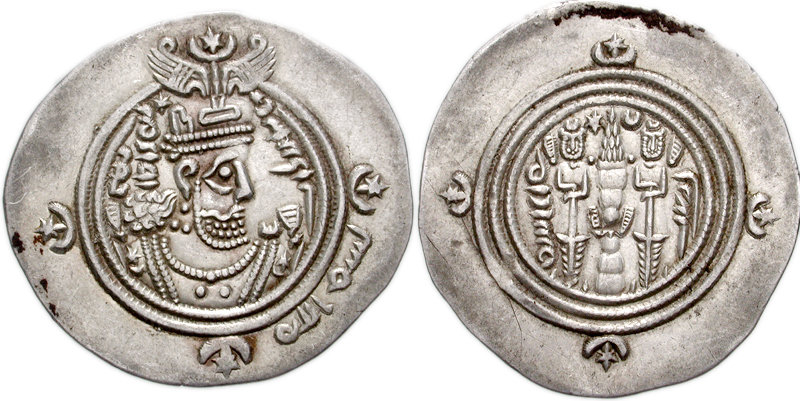
Coin of the Rashidun Caliphate. Imitation of Sasanid Empire ruler Khosrow II type. BYS (Bishapur) mint. Dated YE 25 = AH 36 (AD 656). Sasanian style bust imitating Khosrow II right; bismillah in margin/ Fire altar with ribbons and attendants; star and crescent flanking flames; date to left, mint name to right.

Under Umar and his immediate successors, the Arab conquerors attempted to maintain their political and cultural cohesion despite the attractions of the civilizations they had conquered. The Arabs initially settled in the garrison towns rather than on scattered estates.

The new non-Muslim subjects were tolerated by the state and known as dhimmi (protected), and were to pay a special tax, the jizya (tribute), which was calculated at varying individual rates, usually two dirhams for able-bodied men of military age, in return for exemption from military service. Women and children were exempted from the jizya. Mass conversions were neither desired nor allowed, at least in the first few centuries of Arab rule.

Umar is reported to have issued the following instructions about the unconverted people: "Make it easy for him, who can not pay tribute; help him who is weak, let them keep their titles, but do not give them our kuniyat [Arabic traditional nicknames or titles]." Umar's liberal policies were continued by at least his immediate successors. In his dying charge to Uthman, he is reported to have said, "I charge the caliph after me to be kind to the dhimmis, to keep their covenant, to protect them and not to burden them over their strength." As a matter of practicality, the jizya replaced the Sasanian poll taxes, which tended to be much higher than the jizya. In addition to the jizya, the old Sasanian land tax (known in Arabic as Kharaj) was also adopted. Umar is said to have occasionally set up commissions to survey tax burdens in order to ensure that they wouldn't be more than the land could bear. It is reported that Zoroastrians were subjected to humiliation and ridicule when paying the jizya in order to make them feel inferior.

At least under the Rashiduns and early Umayyads, the administrative system of the late Sasanian period was largely retained: a pyramidal system where each quarter of the state was divided into provinces, the provinces into districts, and the districts into sub-districts. Provinces were called ustan (Middle Persian ostan), and the districts shahrs, centered upon a district capital known as a shahristan. The subdistricts were called tasok in Middle Persian, which was adopted into Arabic as tassuj (plural tasasij).

=== Religion ===
Zoroastrians were made to pay an extra tax called jizya, or be killed, enslaved or imprisoned. Those paying jizya were subjected to insults and humiliation by the tax collectors. Zoroastrians who were captured as slaves in wars were given their freedom if they converted to Islam. While giving freedom of choice, the Arab conquerors designated privileges for those who converted to Islam and in theory gave them rights equal to Arab Muslims. These privileges included exemption from jizya. The conversion process was slow and uncompleted, stretching over many centuries, with a majority of Persians still following Zoroastrianism at the turn of the millennium.

Muslim leaders in their effort to win converts encouraged attendance at Muslim prayer with promises of money and allowed the Quran to be recited in Persian instead of Arabic so that it would be intelligible to all. Islam was readily accepted by Zoroastrians who were employed in industrial and artisan positions because, according to Zoroastrian dogma, such occupations that involved defiling fire made them impure. Moreover, Muslim missionaries did not encounter difficulty in explaining Islamic tenets to Zoroastrians, as there were many similarities between the faiths. According to Thomas Walker Arnold, the Persian would meet Ahura Mazda and Ahriman under the names of Allah and Iblis. In Afghanistan, Islam was spread due to Umayyad missionary efforts particularly under the reigns of Hisham ibn Abd al-Malik and Umar ibn Abd al-Aziz.

There were also large and thriving Christian and Jewish communities, along with smaller numbers of Buddhists and other groups. The population moved slowly and steadily toward Islam. The nobility and citizens converted first. Islam spread more slowly among the peasantry and the dihqans, or landed gentry. By the late 10th century, the majority of the Persians had become Muslim.

Until the 15th century, most Persian Muslims were Sunni Muslims of the Shafi'i and Hanafi legal schools, with the rise of the Safavids in the early 16th century and their forced conversion of Sunnis, Shi'a Islam came to dominate the land.

== Language of Persia ==
During the Rashidun Caliphate, the official language of Persia (including Mesopotamia) remained Middle Persian (Pahlavi), just as the official languages of Syria and Egypt remained Greek, both languages came to the region through the conquering Greek Macedonian and Persian Achaemenid empires. During the Umayyad Caliphate, the Umayyads made Arabic the primary language of their subjected people throughout their empire. Particularly, Al-Hajjaj ibn Yusuf (661–714) officially changed the administrative language of Iraq from Middle Persian (Pahlavi) to Arabic; this was the first time since the Neo-Babylonian Empire that a Semitic language was reinstated as an official language in Mesopotamia (Iraq). Arabic mainly supplanted other Afro-Asiatic sister languages, like Coptic in Egypt and Berber and Punic in the Maghreb region (Berber is still spoken and official in Algeria and Morocco), but the more distant Indo-European languages like Middle Persian and Kurdish proved to be more enduring. Most of Middle Persian structure and vocabulary survived, evolving into New Persian. Persian incorporated a certain amount of Arabic vocabulary, especially words pertaining to religion (and later to science and arts), and it switched from the Pahlavi scripts to a modified version of the Arabic alphabet. Today Persian is spoken officially in Iran, Afghanistan, and Tajikistan.

== Urbanisation ==
The Arab conquest of Persia led to a period of extreme urbanisation in Iran, starting with the ascension of the Abbasid dynasty and ending in the 11th century CE. This was particularly true for the eastern parts of the country, for regions like Khorasan and Transoxiana. During this period, Iran saw the development of massive metropolises, some reaching population numbers of up to 200,000 people. This period of extreme urbanisation was followed in the late 11th and early 12th century by a collapse of the Iranian economy, which led to large scale emigrations of Iranians into Central Asia, India, the rest of West Asia, and Anatolia. This catastrophe has been cited by some as reason for the Persian language becoming widespread throughout Central Asia and large parts of West Asia.

== See also ==
- Arab-Byzantine Wars
- Arab rule in Georgia
- Islamic conquest of Afghanistan
- Islamization of Iran
- Military history of Iran
- Safavid conversion of Iran to Shia Islam
- Muslim conquest of Transoxiana
- Spread of Islam
- History of Iran after Islam
- Iran during the Caliphate
- Ali's Eastern Campaigns

== Sources ==
- Bashear, Suliman (1997). Arabs and Others in Early Islam. Darwin Press. ISBN 978-0-87850-126-7.
- Bosworth, Clifford Edmund (1997). "Sīstān". The Encyclopedia of Islam, New Edition, Volume IX: San–Sze. Leiden, and New York: BRILL. pp. 681–685. ISBN 9789004082656.
- Bosworth, C. E. (2011). "SISTĀN ii. In the Islamic period". Encyclopaedia Iranica.
- Boyce, Mary (2001). Zoroastrians: Their Religious Beliefs and Practices. Psychology Press. ISBN 978-0-415-23902-8.
- Christensen, Peter (1993). The Decline of Iranshahr: Irrigation and Environments in the History of the Middle East, 500 B.C. to A.D. 1500. Museum Tusculanum Press. pp. 1–351. ISBN 9788772892597.
- Daniel, Elton (2001). The History of Iran. Greenwood Press. ISBN 978-0-313-30731-7.
- Daryaee, Touraj (2009). Sasanian Persia: The Rise and Fall of an Empire. I.B.Tauris. pp. 1–240. ISBN 978-0857716668.
- Daryaee, Touraj. "Collapse of Sasanian Power in Fars". Collapse of Sasanian Power in Fars. Fullerton, California: California State University. pp. 3–18.
- Donner, Fred (1981). The Early Islamic Conquests. Princeton. ISBN 978-0-691-05327-1.
- Gazerani, Saghi (2015). The Sistani Cycle of Epics and Iran's National History: On the Margins of Historiography. BRILL. pp. 1–250. ISBN 9789004282964.
- Greatrex, Geoffrey; Lieu, Samuel N. C. (2002). The Roman Eastern Frontier and the Persian Wars (Part II, 363–630 AD). New York, New York and London, United Kingdom: Routledge (Taylor & Francis). ISBN 0-415-14687-9.
- A. K. S., Lambton (1999). "FĀRS iii. History in the Islamic Period". Encyclopaedia Iranica, Vol. IX, Fasc. 4. pp. 337–341.
- Madelung, Wilferd (1997). The Succession to Muhammad: A Study of the Early Caliphate. Cambridge University Press. ISBN 9780521646963.
- Marshak, B.I.; Negmatov, N.N. (1996). "Sogdiana". In B.A. Litvinsky, Zhang Guang-da and R. Shabani Samghabadi (ed.). History of Civilizations of Central Asia, Volume III: The Crossroads of Civilizations: A.D. 250 to 750. UNESCO. ISBN 92-3-103211-9.
- Meri, Josef W.; Bacharach, Jere L. (2006), Medieval Islamic Civilization: L-Z, index, Medieval Islamic Civilization: An Encyclopedia, vol. II (illustrated ed.), Taylor & Francis, p. 878, ISBN 9780415966924
- Morony, M. (1987). "Arab Conquest of Iran". Encyclopaedia Iranica. Vol. 2, ANĀMAKA – ĀṮĀR AL-WOZARĀʾ.
- Morony, M. (1986). "ʿARAB ii. Arab conquest of Iran". Encyclopaedia Iranica, Vol. II, Fasc. 2. pp. 203–210.
- Pourshariati, Parvaneh (2008). Decline and Fall of the Sasanian Empire: The Sasanian-Parthian Confederacy and the Arab Conquest of Iran. London and New York: I.B. Tauris. ISBN 978-1-84511-645-3.
- Shapur Shahbazi, A. (2005). "SASANIAN DYNASTY". Encyclopaedia Iranica, Online Edition.
- Sicker, Martin (2000). The Islamic World in Ascendancy: From the Arab Conquests to the Siege of Vienna. Praeger. ISBN 978-0-275-96892-2.
- Spuler, Bertold (2003). Persian Historiography and Geography: Bertold Spuler on Major Works Produced in Iran, the Caucasus, Central Asia, India and Early Ottoman Turkey. Translated by M. Ismail Marcinkowski, M. Ismail. Clifford Edmund Bosworth (foreword). Singapore: Pustaka Nasional. ISBN 978-9971-77-488-2.
- Zarrin'kub, Abd al-Husayn (1999). Ruzgaran: tarikh-i Iran az aghz ta saqut saltnat Pahlvi. Sukhan. ISBN 978-964-6961-11-1.
- Zarrinkub, Abd al-Husain (1975). "The Arab conquest of Iran and its aftermath". The Cambridge History of Iran, Volume 4: From the Arab Invasion to the Saljuqs. Cambridge: Cambridge University Press. pp. 1–57. ISBN 978-0-521-20093-6.
