= Shahriyar bin Kanara =

Sasanian military officer (d. 636)

Shahriyar, son of Kanadbak, (died 636) was a Sasanian commander who fought against the Muslims during the Islamic invasion of Persia. He died along with Mushegh III, Bahman Jadhuyih, Jalinus and Rostam Farrokhzād in the Battle of al-Qadisiyyah.

== Sources ==
- Pourshariati, Parvaneh (2008). Decline and Fall of the Sasanian Empire: The Sasanian-Parthian Confederacy and the Arab Conquest of Iran. London, United Kingdom: I.B. Tauris. ISBN 978-1-84511-645-3.
