= Abu Mansur Mamari =

10th-century Iranian nobleman

Abu Mansur Mamari (Persian: ابومنصور معمری) was an Iranian nobleman who served as the personal minister of the Samanid general Abu Mansur Muhammad. At an unknown date, the latter wanted to create a Shahnameh ("Book of Kings"), and ordered Abu Mansur Mamari to invite several scholars. They created a New Persian version of the Khwaday-Namag in 957, and expanded it with other sources. The book became known as "Shahnama-yi Abu Mansuri" (the book of kings of Abu Mansuri). However, only the introduction of the book remains today, which claims that Abu Mansur Mamari was descended from Kanadbak, who served as the kanarang of the Sasanian king Khosrau II. Not much more is known about Abu Mansur Mamari; he later died in the 10th-century.

== Sources ==
- Khalegi-Motlagh, Dj. (1983). "ABŪ MANṢŪR MAʿMARĪ". Encyclopaedia Iranica, Vol. I, Fasc. 4. p. 337.
- Frye, R.N. (1975). "The Sāmānids". In Frye, R.N. (ed.). The Cambridge History of Iran, Volume 4: From the Arab Invasion to the Saljuqs. Cambridge: Cambridge University Press. pp. 136–161. ISBN 0-521-20093-8.
