= Abarshahr =

Satrapy of the Sassanian Empire

Coordinates: 36.20°N 58.8°E

- Province of the Sasanian Empire
- c. 240–651
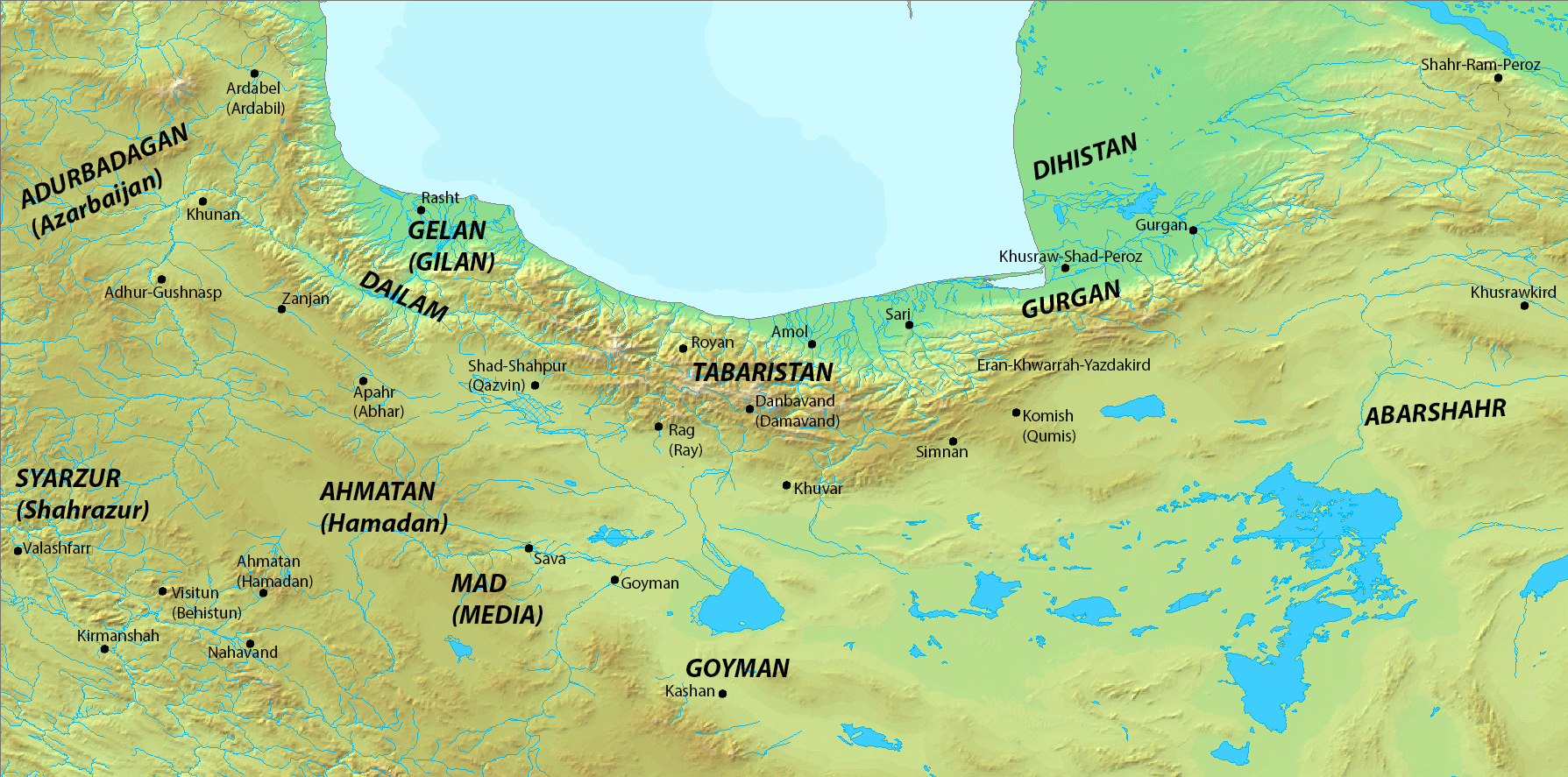
- Map of Abarshahr (far right) and its surroundings during the late Sasanian era
- Capital: Nishapur
- Historical era: Late Antiquity
  - Established: c. 240
  - Disestablished: 651
Succeeded by
Kanarang
House of Karen
Rashidun Caliphate
Bavand dynasty
- Today part of: Iran

Abarshahr (Persian: اَبَرشهر) or Nishapur (Persian: نیشاپور) was a Sasanian satrapy (province) in Late Antiquity, that lay within the kust of Khorasan. The province bordered Media in the west, Hyrcania in the north west, Margiana in the north east, and Harev in the south east. The governor of Abarshahr is attested to have held the unique title of kanarang, distinguished from the title of marzban given to governors of frontier provinces. Abarshahr came to be known as one of the nicknames of the city of Nishapur which was considered to be the capital city of the province of Abarshahr during the Sassanian period and later on.

== Etymology ==
Several etymologies have been put forward as to the origin of the name of the province. During the Middle Ages, for example, Arab geographers stated that the name meant "cloud city". It has also been interpreted to mean "upper country". A more recent etymology that suggests that Abarshahr derives from Aparn-xšahr, "land of the Aparni" is considered the most accurate.

== History ==
The province was formed during the reign of Shapur I as part of his efforts to establish greater centralisation in the empire, and was made up of the vassal kingdom of Satarop, who had declared fealty to Shapur's father, Ardashir I, after his victory over the last Parthian king, Artabanus V, at the Battle of Hormozdgān in 224 AD. The city of Nishapur (Middle Persian: Nēw-S̲h̲āhpūr "good city of Shapur) was founded or rebuilt by Shapur I as the administrative capital of Abarshahr, close to the temple of Adur Burzen-Mihr, home to one of three "Great Fires" held sacred by Zoroastrians. Nishapur was considered a more secure location than the former capital of the province, Tus, against raids from nomadic tribes.

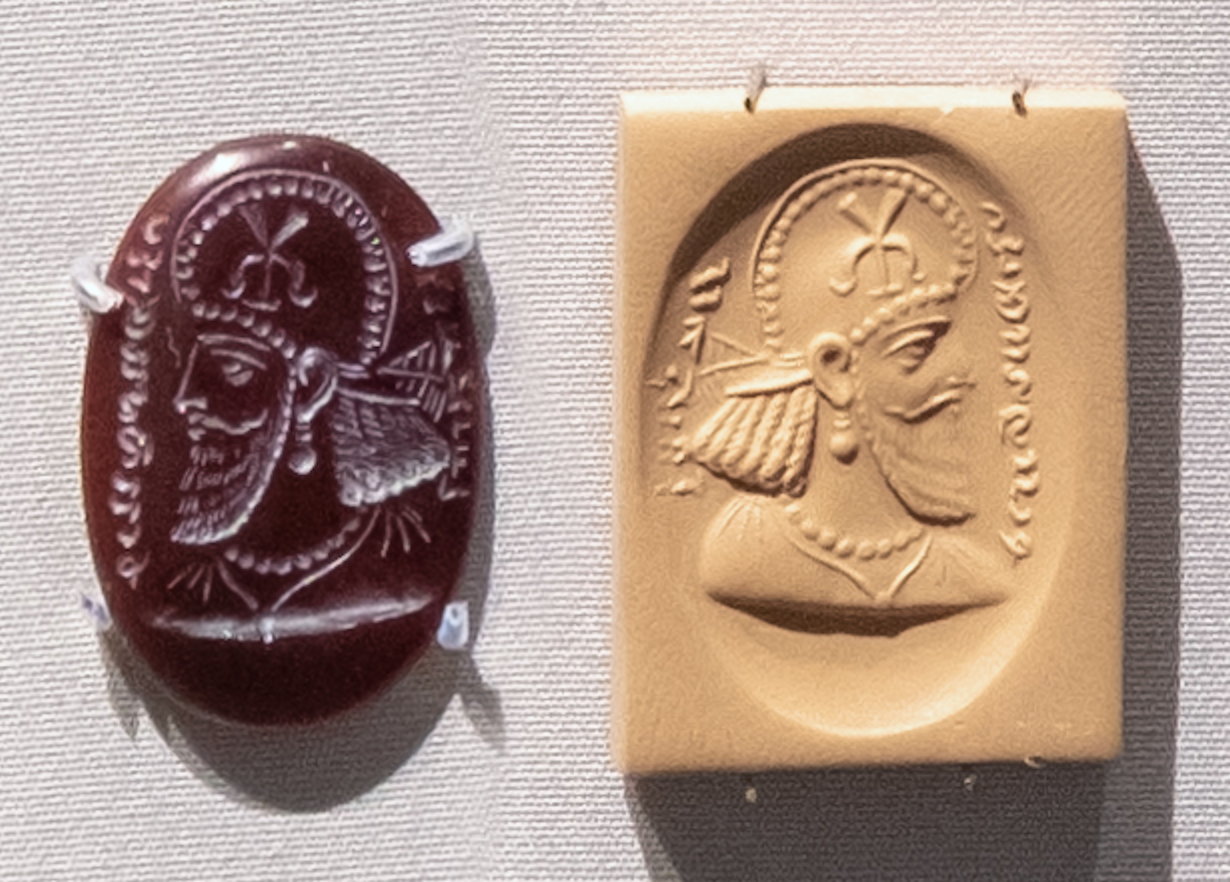
Sasanian seal with inscription in Pahlavi "Perozhormizd, son of the Kanarang", "Kanarang" being the Sasanian military commander of Abarshahr. The cap is decorated with a border of pearls. The title is attested from the 5th century CE. British Museum 134847.

Mar Ammo, a disciple of Mani, founder of Manichaeism, led a mission to Abarshahr accompanied by the Parthian prince Ardavan and several others during the 260s. It is suggested that Ardavan, as a Manichean member of the Parthian elite, helped Mar Ammo to preach amongst the Parthian nobility and spread Manichaeism.

In 629, during the Sasanian civil war of 628-632, Abarshahr was briefly ruled by the Sasanian usurper Khosrow III. In 651, the last Sasanian king Yazdegerd III was murdered by under the orders of his own general, Mahoe Suri, which marked the end of the Sasanian dynasty. However, Abarshahr continued to be under the rule of the kanarang, who was no longer under the suzerainty of the Sasanians. However, this was soon to end: in 652, Abarshahr was invaded by the Arab military general Abdullah ibn Aamir, who made a treaty with the kanarang, Kanadbak. In the treaty Kanadbak agreed to pay tribute to the Arabs while still remaining in control of his territories in Tus. However, at the same time, the Karenids of Nishapur under Burzin Shah and Sawar Karin, were threatening both Kanadbak and Abdullah, and managed to reclaim territory in Khorasan, which included cities such as Nishapur which was once under their control. Abdullah then promised Kanadbak to give him back his lost territory, in return for help against the Karenid rebels. They then started pillaging the surroundings of Nishapur, and fought heavily to capture the city.

Sawar then tried to make peace with Abdullah, and told him that he would open the gates of Nishapur if the latter pardoned him. Abdullah agreed, however, when the gates were opened, he entered the gate with his army, and started to plunder the city and killing citizens, until Kanadbak said to him: "O amir, once you have been victorious and triumphant forgiveness is a higher [virtue] than revenge and retribution." Abdullah then did as the latter said and restored the city to Kanadbak, who continued to rule as a Rashidun vassal.

== Sources ==
- Gaube, H. (1982). "ABARŠAHR". Encyclopaedia Iranica, Vol. I, Fasc. 1. p. 67.
- Pourshariati, Parvaneh (2008). Decline and Fall of the Sasanian Empire: The Sasanian-Parthian Confederacy and the Arab Conquest of Iran. London and New York: I.B. Tauris. ISBN 978-1-84511-645-3.
