= Kanadbak =

Sasanian military commander

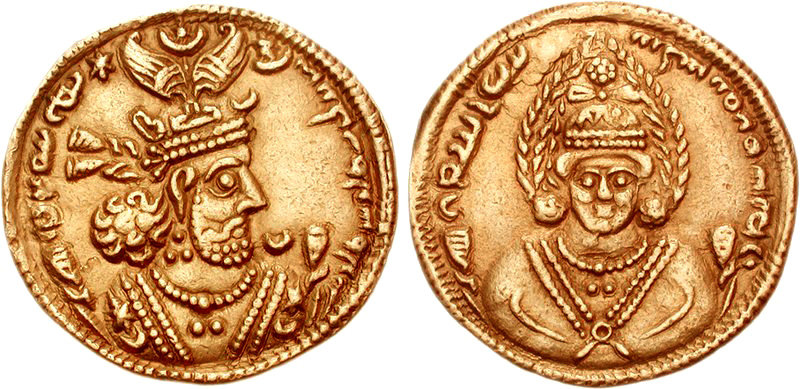
Golden coin of Khosrau II

Kanadbak, also known as Kanara, was an Iranian nobleman, who was the kanarang during the reign of the Sasanian king Khosrau II (r. 590–628), and various other Sasanian monarchs, which includes Yazdegerd III (r. 632–651), the last Sasanian king.

== Biography ==
Kanadbak is first mentioned in 628, as one of the conspirators who overthrew Khosrau II. After Khosrau's overthrow, his son Kavadh II crowned himself as shahanshah of the Sasanian Empire. Three days later, Kavadh ordered Mihr Hormozd to execute his father. In 632, after a period of coups and revolts, Yazdegerd III was crowned as king of the Sasanian Empire at Estakhr. One year later, the Muslim Arabs invaded Persia, and by 636, they were camping at Al-Qādisiyyah, a city close to Ctesiphon, the capital of the Sasanian Empire.

The Sasanian spahbed, Rostam Farrokhzad, then prepared a counter-attack, and prepared an army which included: The Parsig faction under Piruz Khosrow, Bahman Jadhuyih and Hormuzan. The Pahlav faction under Rostam himself and Mihran Razi. An Armenian contingent under Jalinus and Musel III Mamikonian. The army also included Kanadbak himself and his son Shahriyar bin Kanara. During the battle, the Sasanian army was defeated, and Shahriyar, along with Musel, Bahman, Jalinus and Rostam, were killed.

Kanadbak then fled to his domains in Abarshahr, and is later mentioned in 652, when Abdullah ibn Aamir invaded Khorasan, and made a treaty with him. In the treaty Kanadbak agreed to pay tribute to the Arabs while still remaining in control of his territories in Tus. However, the Karenids of Nishapur under Burzin Shah and Sawar Karin, were threatening both Kanadbak and Abdullah, and reclaimed territory in Khorasan which was once under their control. In promise of regaining his lost territories, Kanadbak agreed to aid Abdullah in capturing Nishapur from the Karenid rebels. Abdullah and Kanadbak started pillaging the areas of Nishapur, and fought heavily to capture the city.

Sawar then tried to make peace with Abdullah, and told him that he would open the gates of Nishapur if the latter pardoned him. Abdullah agreed, however, when the gates were opened, he entered the gate with his army, and started to plunder the city and killing citizens, until Kanadbak said to him: "O amir, once you have been victorious and triumphant forgiveness is a higher [virtue] than revenge and retribution." Abdullah then did as the latter said and restored the city to Kanadbak's domains. What happened to Kanadbak after is not known. The 10th-century Iranian nobleman Abu Mansur Mamari, was said to have been descended from Kanadbak.

== Sources ==
- Houtsma, Martijn Theodoor, ed. (1993). E.J. Brill's first encyclopaedia of Islam 1913-1936, Volume VIII. BRILL. ISBN 90-04-09794-5.
- Pourshariati, Parvaneh (2008). Decline and Fall of the Sasanian Empire: The Sasanian-Parthian Confederacy and the Arab Conquest of Iran. London, United Kingdom: I.B. Tauris. ISBN 978-1-84511-645-3.
- Khalegi-Motlagh, Dj. (1983). "ABŪ MANṢŪR MAʿMARĪ". Encyclopaedia Iranica, Vol. I, Fasc. 4. p. 337.
