= Yazdanfar =

Yazdanfar was an Iranian noble who ruled Qom as a Sasanian vassal. In the late 640s/early 650s, the invading Arabs, who had conquered most of the Sasanian Empire, reached Qum, where Yazdanfar made peace with them, giving them a village to settle in. The reason for his hospitality was that his domain often suffered from raids by the Daylamites, which he hoped would now be defended by the Arabs.

== Sources ==
- Kennedy, Hugh (2007). The Great Arab Conquests: How the Spread of Islam Changed the World We Live In. Philadelphia, Pennsylvania: Da Capo Press. ISBN 978-0-306-81740-3.
