= Gushnaspdad =

Iranian nobleman of the Sasanian era

- Died: 498/9; Ctesiphon
- Military career
- Allegiance: Sasanian Empire
- Branch: Sasanian army
- Rank: Kanarang

Gushnaspdād, known in Byzantine sources as Gousanastadēs (Γουσαναστάδης), was a Sasanian nobleman, who was kanarang during the reign of Balash (r. 484–488), and Kavad I (r. 488–531).

== Biography ==
Gushnaspdad first appears in 496, as one of the supporters of Jamasp. After Balash's accession, Gushnaspdad urged the Sasanian noblemen to execute Kavad I, the brother of Jamasp. He is reportedly said to have told the Sasanian noblemen while holding a knife: "You see this knife, how extremely small it is; nevertheless it is able at present time to accomplish a deed which, be assured, my dear Persians, a little later two myriads of mail clad men could not bring to pass."

However, the Sasanian nobles declined the decision, and instead had Kavad imprisoned; however, he later managed to escape and took refugee in Central Asia. In 498/9, Kavad returned to Iran with the aid of the Hephthalites. Kavad then captured Ctesiphon, restored his rule, and had Gushnaspdad executed. Gushnaspdad was replaced by Adergoudounbades as kanarang.

== Sources ==
- Schindel, Nikolaus (2013). "Kawād I i. Reign". Encyclopaedia Iranica, Vol. XVI, Fasc. 2. pp. 136–141.
- Rezakhani, Khodadad (2017). ReOrienting the Sasanians: East Iran in Late Antiquity. Edinburgh University Press. pp. 1–256. ISBN 9781474400305.
- Pourshariati, Parvaneh (2008). Decline and Fall of the Sasanian Empire: The Sasanian-Parthian Confederacy and the Arab Conquest of Iran. London, United Kingdom: I.B. Tauris. ISBN 978-1-84511-645-3.
