= Burzin Shah =

Sasanian nobleman and governor

Burzin Shah, also known by the Arabicized form of Barzan Jah, was an Iranian nobleman from the House of Karen. A descendant of Sukhra, he was the governor of Nishapur during the reign of the Sasanian king Yazdegerd III (r. 632–651).

== Biography ==
In 651-652, Abdullah ibn Aamir invaded Khorasan, and made a treaty with the kanarang of Tus, Kanadbak. In the treaty Kanadbak agreed to pay tribute to the Arabs while still remaining in control of his territories in Tus. In order to strengthen the weakened Karen family, and to reclaim lost Karenid territory, Burzin, along with another Karenid named Sawar Karin, made resistance to the Arabs and tried to reclaim territory from the Kanārangīyān family. However, Abdullah, with the aid of Kanadbak, invaded Nishapur and defeated the two rebels. Abdullah then rewarded Kanadbak by giving him control of Nishapur. It is not known if Burzin was killed during this event.

== Sources ==
- Pourshariati, Parvaneh (2008). Decline and Fall of the Sasanian Empire: The Sasanian-Parthian Confederacy and the Arab Conquest of Iran. London and New York: I.B. Tauris. ISBN 978-1-84511-645-3.
