= Mushegh III Mamikonian =

Armenian general of the Sasanian army (d. 636)

Mushegh III Mamikonian (Old Armenian: Մուշեղ Մամիկոնեան) was an Armenian prince and general in the Sasanian army that fought against the Arabs during the Muslim conquest of Persia. He was killed during the Battle of al-Qadisiyyah in 636.

== Family ==
The family of Mushegh III Mamikonian is disputed. The Armenian historian Sebeos calls him a son of Davit Mamikonian. According to Christian Settipani, Davit was probably the son of Hamazasp, who was the son of Mushegh II Mamikonian. However, Cyril Toumanoff considers Davit to be the son of Vahan II. Historians, however, agree that Mushegh was the elder brother of Hamazasp IV and Grigor I Mamikonian, who were both princes of Armenia.

== Death ==
In 636, Mushegh III, at the head of an army of 3000 men, and Grigor, prince of Syunik, at the head of 1000 men, were the Armenian contingent who joined the army of Rostam Farrokhzad, the spahbed of the Sasanian forces, who was preparing to fight the Muslim Arabs who were camping at Qаdisiyyah. Mushegh, along with his two nephews, died during the battle. Grigor of Syunik, along with his one son, and Rostam and much of the Sasanian army were also killed in the battle. In Parvaneh Pourshariati's view, Mushegh may be identifiable with Jalinus, a Sasanian general mentioned in Arabic sources who also died at Qadisiyyah.

== Children ==
According to Cyril Toumanoff, and some other historians, Mushegh had a son named Mushegh IV Mamikonian, who was also a sparapet and prince of Armenia.

== See also ==
- Persian Armenia

== Sources ==
- Pourshariati, Parvaneh (2008). Decline and Fall of the Sasanian Empire: The Sasanian-Parthian Confederacy and the Arab Conquest of Iran. London and New York: I.B. Tauris. ISBN 978-1-84511-645-3.
- Sebeos (1999). The Armenian History Attributed to Sebeos, Part I: Translation and Notes. Translated, with notes, by R.W. Thomson. Historical commentary by James Howard-Johnston. Assistance from Tim Greenwood. Liverpool University Press. ISBN 0-85323-564-3.
- Settipani, Christian (2006). Continuité des élites à Byzance durant les siècles obscurs. Les princes caucasiens et l'Empire du vie au ixe siècle (in French). Paris: de Boccard. ISBN 978-2-7018-0226-8.
- Toumanoff, Cyrille (1990). "Vice-rois iraniens (Marzpans) d'Arménie". Les dynasties de la Caucasie chrétienne de l'Antiquité jusqu'au xixe siècle : Tables généalogiques et chronologiques (in French). Rome. pp. 506–507.
