= Kanarang =

Sasanian military title

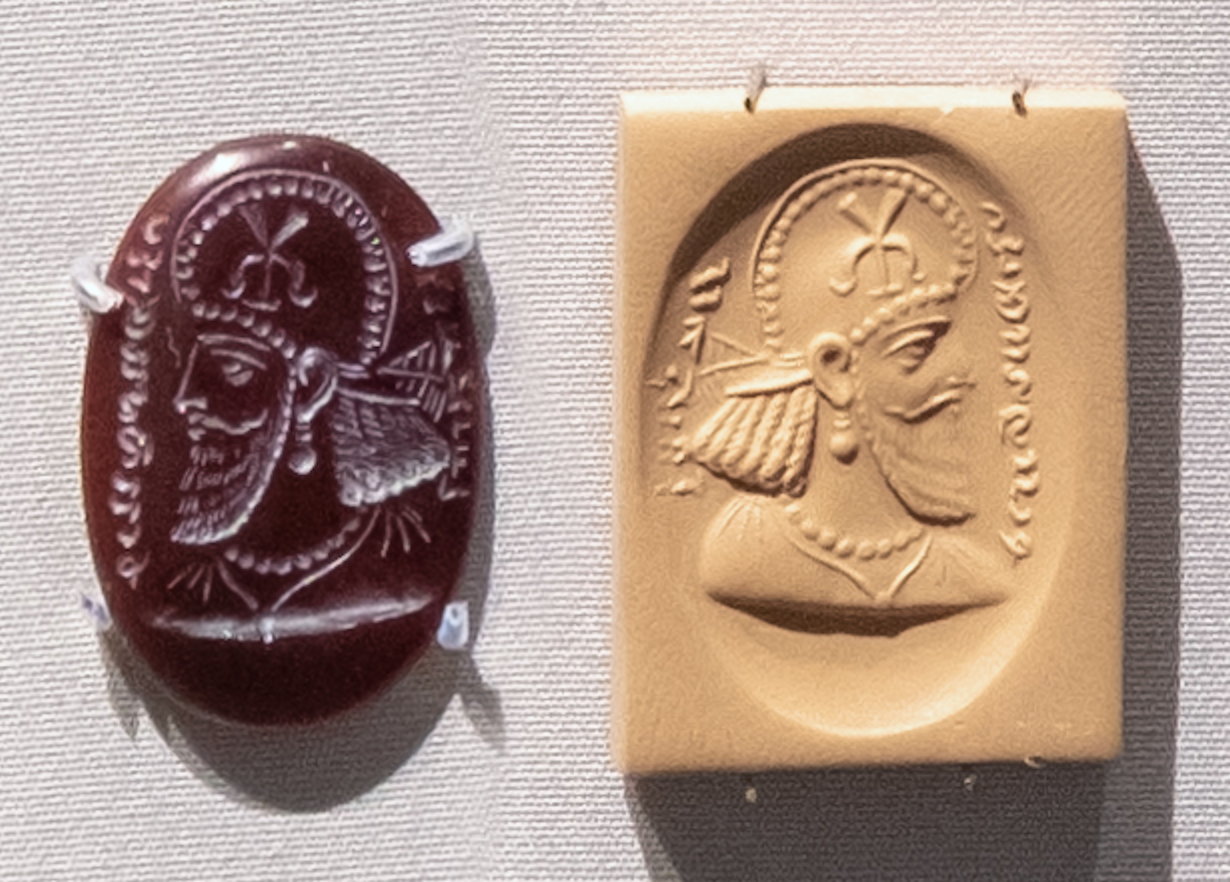
Sasanian seal with inscription in Pahlavi "Perozhormizd, son of the Kanarang". The cap is decorated with a border of pearls. Kanarangs are attested from the 5th century CE. British Museum 134847.

The Kanārang (Persian: کنارنگ) was a unique title in the Sasanian military, given to the commander of the Sasanian Empire's northeasternmost frontier province, Abarshahr (encompassing the cities of Nishapur, Tus and Abiward). In Byzantine sources, it is rendered as chanaranges (Greek: χαναράγγης) and often used, for instance by Procopius, in lieu of the holder's actual name.

The title was used instead of the more conventional marzban, which was held by the rest of the Iranian frontier wardens. Like the other marzbans, the position was hereditary. The family holding it (the Kanarangiyan) is first attested in the reign of Yazdegerd I (r. 399–421), but was descended from some pre-Sasanian, most likely Parthian, dynasty. They enjoyed a high prestige and great authority in the Sasanian Empire's northeastern borderlands, as reflected in their glorified description in the Shahnameh of the great Persian poet Ferdowsi. They were among the great families that deposed the last powerful Sasanian monarch Khosrow II (r. 590–628) in 628.

The family was active until the very end of the Sasanian realm. A man called Kanara in Arab sources commanded the Iranian light cavalry at the decisive Battle of al-Qadisiyyah, and his son, Shahriyar bin Kanara, is reported to have fought valiantly before being killed. The family is later recorded as assisting the Muslim conquest of Khorasan by Abd-Allah ibn Amir, and being rewarded with the right to keep the province of Tus and half of the province of Nishapur under their control. They were ultimately taken down by the Arab military officer Humayd ibn Qahtaba, probably during the latter's governorship of Khorasan during the reign of the caliph al-Mansur (r. 754–775).

== Known holders of the post ==
- Gushnaspdad, attested 484–488
- Adergoudounbades, 488–541
- Bahram, from 541
- Kanadbak, attested 628–652, son Shahriyar bin Kanara

== Sources ==
- Crone, Patricia (2012). The Nativist Prophets of Early Islamic Iran: Rural Revolt and Local Zoroastrianism. Cambridge University Press. pp. 1–543. ISBN 9781139510769.
- Houtsma, Martijn Theodoor, ed. (1993). E.J. Brill's first encyclopaedia of Islam 1913-1936, Volume VIII. BRILL. ISBN 90-04-09794-5.
- Pourshariati, Parvaneh (2008). Decline and Fall of the Sasanian Empire: The Sasanian-Parthian Confederacy and the Arab Conquest of Iran. I.B. Tauris. ISBN 978-1-84511-645-3.
