= Sa'd ibn Abi Waqqas =

Muslim general (c. 595 – 674)

- سَعْدُ بْنُ أَبِي وَقَّاصٍ

Governor of Kufa
- Monarchs: Umar; Uthman
- Preceded by: Office established
- Succeeded by: Al-Mughira ibn Shu'ba

Personal details
- Born: c. 595 Mecca, Arabia
- Died: c. 674 (aged 78–79) Medina, Umayyad Caliphate
- Spouses: Salma bint Khasafah; Makhita bint Amr
- Relations: Banu Zuhra (clan)
- Children: Umar; Muhammad; Amir; Ishaq; ʿĀʾisha

Military service
- Allegiance: Muhammad (610–632); Rashidun Caliphate (632–656)
- Years of service: 624–c. 644
- Battles/wars: Under Muhammad: Battle of Badr (624); Battle of Uhud (625); Battle of the Trench (627); Battle of Khaybar (629); Battle of Hunayn (630); Battle of Autas (630); Ridda Wars; Battle of Zhuqissa (632); Battle of Aqraba (633); Muslim conquest of Persia; Battle of al-Qadisiyyah (636); Battle of Burs (636); Battle of Babylon (636); Battle of Ctesiphon (637); Battle of Nahavand (642)

Sa'd ibn Abi Waqqas ibn Wuhayb al-Zuhri (Arabic: سَعْدُ بْنُ أَبِي وَقَّاصِ بْنِ وُهَيْبٍ اَلزُّهْرِيُّ, romanized: Saʿd ibn Abī Waqqāṣ ibn Wuhayb al-Zuhrī) was a Muslim commander. He was the founder of Kufa and served as its governor under Umar ibn al-Khattab. He played a leading role in the Muslim conquest of Persia and was a close companion of the Islamic prophet Muhammad.

Sa'd was the seventh free adult man to embrace Islam, which he did at the age of seventeen. Sa'd participated in all battles under Muhammad during their stay in Medina. Sa'd was famous for his leadership in the Battle of al-Qadisiyyah and the conquest of the Sasanian capital Ctesiphon in 636. After the Battle of al-Qadisiyyah and the Siege of Ctesiphon (637), Sa'd served as the supreme commander of the Rashidun army in Iraq, which conquered Khuzestan and built the garrison city of Kufa. Due to complaints about his conduct, he was later dismissed from his post by the caliph Umar. During the First Fitna, Sa'd was known for leading the neutral faction that contained the majority of the companions of Muhammad and their followers, who refused to be involved in the civil war. Traditions of Chinese Muslims hold that he introduced Islam to China during a diplomatic visit in 651, though these accounts are disputed.

Sunni historians and scholars regard Sa'd as an honored figure due to his companionship with Muhammad, his inclusion as one of the ten to whom Paradise was promised, and his participation in the Battle of Badr, whose participants are collectively held in high esteem.

== History ==
Sa'd was one of the first to embrace Islam. He was seventeen years old when he converted to Islam, although Ibn Abd al-Barr reported that Sa'd embraced it at age nineteen. It was said by Ibn Ishaq that Sa'd was one of several individuals invited to Islam by Abu Bakr. Sa'd's mother opposed her son's conversion and threatened to go on a hunger strike until he left Islam, but he did not heed her threat and she finally yielded due to his insistence. Chroniclers reported that Muhammad told Sa'd that God praised his firmness in his faith, but also told him to be kinder to his mother, as filial piety is an important virtue in Islam. Sa'd's brother Amir also converted, prompting their mother to undergo another hunger strike, which likewise failed to deter her second son either.

According to Ibn Hisham's version of Ibn Ishaq's sira, Sa'd and a number of other Muslims were criticized by a group of polytheists in Mecca. This criticism prompted Sa'd to wound one of the polytheists with a camel bone, which Ibn Ishaq deems "the first blood to be shed in Islam".

According to the Fath al-Bari of Ibn Hajar al-Asqalani, Sa'd migrated to Medina before Muhammad along with Ibn Umm Maktum and Mus'ab ibn Umayr, where he continued to practice Islam.

=== Early life in Medina ===
As Sa'd and his siblings arrived in Medina, they immediately pledged allegiance to Muhammad. The Meccan migrants were termed muhajirun, while the local Muslim inhabitants of Medina were known as the Ansar. While in Medina, Sa'd was involved in most of the military operations mounted by the Muslims against the Quraysh of Mecca. His first operation occurred nine months after the migration, when he was tasked with leading 20 men to raid a Qurayshi caravan that passed Kharrar, located between Al-Juhfa and Mecca. This expedition failed, as the caravan escaped.

During a minor reconnaissance operation under Ubayda ibn al-Harith in Rabigh shortly before the Battle of Badr, the team caught the attention of opposing Qurayshi fighters that began to chase them. Sa'd and his team immediately ran away, with some accounts stating that he performed a Parthian shot as he retreated. The team returned to Medina unscathed, and Sa'd prided himself on allowing the Muslim scouts to survive.

==== Battle of Badr ====
During the march to Badr, Muhammad sent Sa'd, Ali, and Zubayr ibn al-Awwam to scout the enemy's movements, as the Muslim army that marched from Medina originally intended to capture the rich caravan of Abu Sufyan ibn Harb instead of facing the main forces of the Meccan Quraysh under Abu Jahl ibn Hisham.

According to a chronicle, Sa'd's first feat of archery occurred during the Battle of Badr, in approximately 624. In this battle, the Muslims formed a phalanx. A hadith states that in the midst of battle Sa'd prayed for his arrow to hit the enemy while stringing his bow, with Muhammad also praying for God to grant Sa'd's wish. Biographers noted that Sa'd's archery skills were troublesome for the Qurayshi forces during the Battle of Badr. (Note: Quoting the narration of Sahih Muslim, chapter: Fadail as-Sahaba: 41.) The 8th century historian and traditionalist, Musa ibn ʿUqba, records that Sa’d also managed to sever Suhayl ibn Amr's sciatic nerve with an arrow during the battle. According to another hadith, he also joined the close combat during the final phase of the battle as the Muslims began to gain the upper hand. He killed a Qurayshi champion named Sa'id ibn al-As and retrieved a sword known as Dha al-Kutayfah (ذا الكُتَيفَة), which he presented to Muhammad as a prize of war. Sa'd also reportedly managed to capture two Qurayshi soldiers during this battle.

Later historians dubbed Sa'd the first Muslim archer for his actions during this battle. His teenage brother Umayr asked to participate in the battle, but Muhammad refused him due to his young age. Umayr continued to ask for permission to fight and was eventually granted it; he died in the course of the battle.

==== Protecting Muhammad in Uhud ====
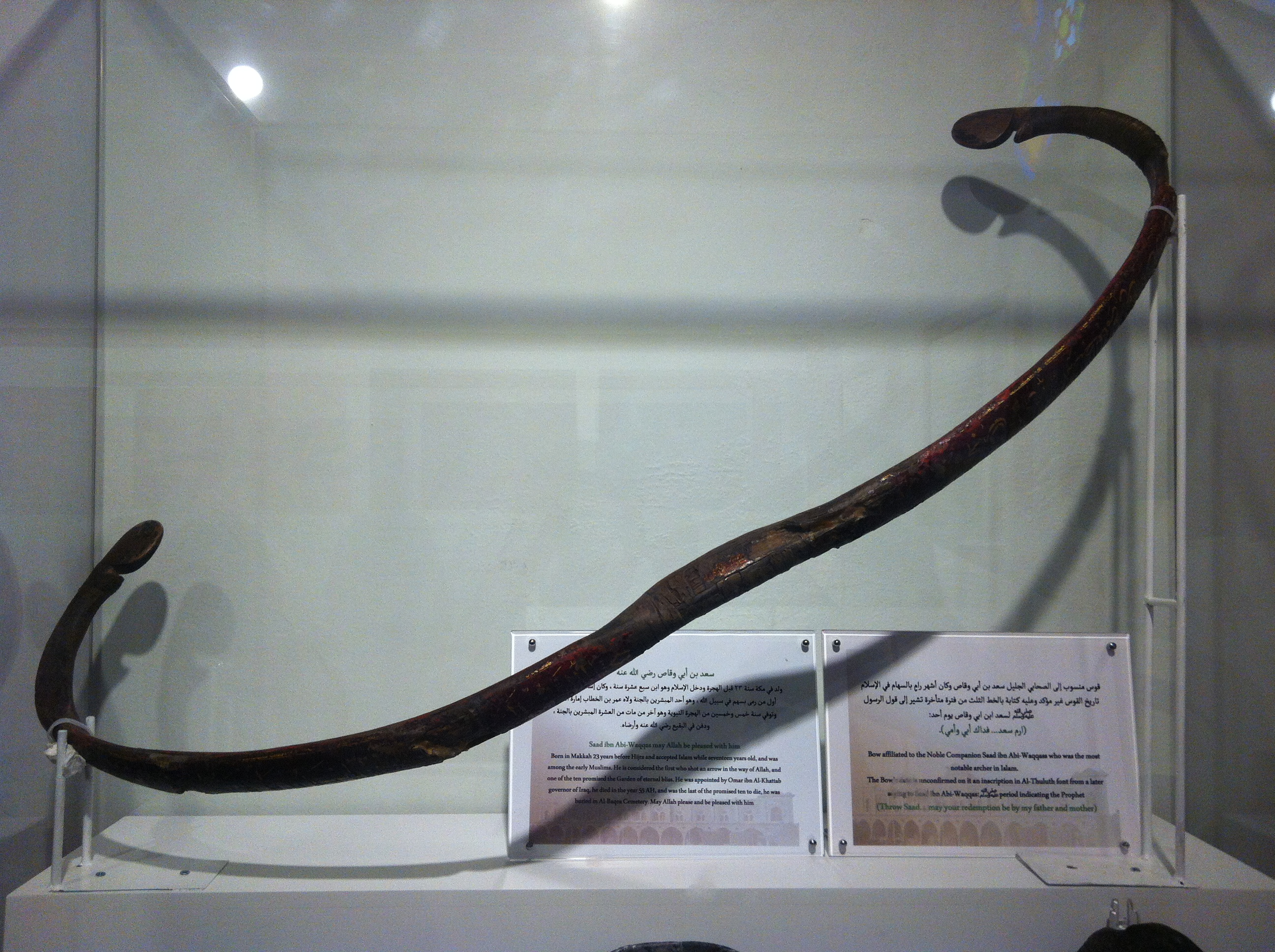
Bow inscribed with the words of Muhammad's order to Sa'd, at Hejaz Railway Museum in Medina

At the Battle of Uhud, Sa'd served in an archer regiment. As the Muslim army gained the upper hand, they were routed by a flanking maneuver by Khalid ibn al-Walid. The Muslim forces scattered, and Muhammad was separated from his soldiers except for about a dozen men, including Sa'd, the muhajirun warrior Talha, the Medinan swordsman Abu Dujana, and about six or seven Ansari soldiers. The group was surrounded by enemy cavalry under Khalid as the Muslim fighters formed a close defensive formation and Sa'd shot his arrows next to Muhammad, who suffered an injury to his shoulder. The outnumbered and encircled Muslims fought until most of them were killed, except Muhammad, Talhah, Abu Dujana, and Sa'd, who tried to assist his comrades with his bow, despite the close combat. (Note: Uthman An-Nahdi said, "On that day (Uhud) during which the Prophet fought, only Talhah bin Ubaydullah and Sa'd remained with the Prophet." Sa'id bin Al-Musayyib said "I heard Sa'd bin Abi Waqqas saying, 'The Messenger of Allah gave me arrows from his quiver on the day of Uhud and said, "Shoot, may I sacrifice my father and mother for you."'" Al-Bukhari also collected this Hadith.) Sa'd resorted to firing multiple arrows at once in the dire situation.

Realizing how Sa'd was affecting the enemies, Muhammad gathered arrows for him and stood next to him while he continuously shot, allowing the encircled Muslims to retreat. As they managed to escape, Muhammad praised Sa'd for his actions.

Later, after Muhammad killed one of the remaining enemy pursuers with his javelin, Sa'd uttered a vow to kill his own brother, Utbah ibn Abi Waqqas, who fought on the side of the enemy, as Utbah had injured Muhammad during the encirclement.

=== After Uhud until the Ridda Wars ===
Along with Abu Bakr, Sa'd ibn Mu'adh, Zubayr ibn al-Awwam, Bilal ibn Rabah, Abbad ibn Bishr, and Abu Ayyub al-Ansari, Sa'd was a member of the Haras (personal bodyguard) unit of Muhammad. When Muhammad and Aisha participated in military expeditions, Sa'd was the one who guarded their tent at night.

Sa'd became one of the most important members of Medina's Muslim political and religious community after he participated in the Pledge of the Tree, (Note: Sahih al-Bukhari no. 6666.) as those who participated in the pledge were collectively praised in the Al-Fath. On the same day as the pledge, Sa'd also witnessed the ratification of the Treaty of Hudaybiyyah that created a ceasefire or non-aggression pact between Medina and Mecca. Until the Expedition of Tabuk, Sa'd was recorded as participating in all battles under Muhammad, including the Battle of the Trench, the Expedition of al-Muraysi', the Siege of Khaybar, the Conquest of Mecca, the battles in Hunayn and Awtas, and the Siege of Ta'if.

When Muhammed died and Abu Bakr was named the first caliph, the Ridda Wars broke out throughout the Arabian Peninsula. Abu Bakr dispatched his elite forces under Usama ibn Zayd to pacify the northern border, while he gathered the rest of the army, including Sa'd, to engage the rebel invaders led by Tulayha in the Battle of Zhu Qissa. Ibn al-Jawzi and Nur ad-Din al-Halabi recorded that Sa'd instead joined the Expedition of Usama bin Zayd along with Umar, Sa'id ibn Zayd, Abu Ubayda ibn al-Jarrah, and Qatada ibn al-Nu'man. After the rebels were routed, Sa'd joined the army marching towards Dumat al-Jandal to crush several Bedouin rebels there.

=== Battle of al-Qadisiyyah ===
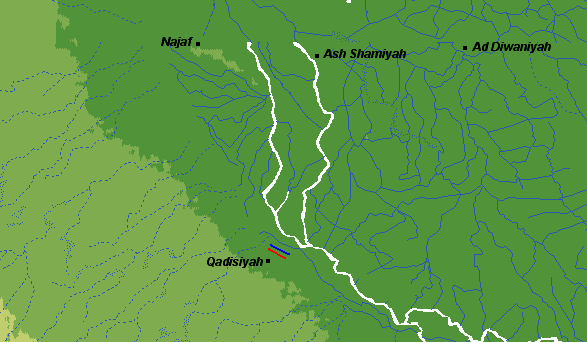
Location of the Battle of Qadisiyyah

In 636, after the ascension of Umar ibn al-Khattab as caliph, he sent Sa'd to lead a corps towards Iraq to assist Abu Ubayd al-Thaqafi in the Muslim conquest of Persia. Al-Basalamah stated that Umar gathered 12,000 soldiers in Medina to serve under Sa'd. (Note: Al-Basalamah believed the caliph was following a hadith stating that "if 12,000 whole-hearted Muslims go for sincere jihad, they will be invincible on any battlefield", although al-Tirmidhi deemed this narration inauthentic and weak.) Before the army could be dispatched from Medina, a message from the Iraq front arrived, stating that Abu Ubayd was killed in action during the Battle of the Bridge and the Rashidun soldiers were forced to withdraw to south-west Iraq. This development caused Umar to change his plans, instructing Sa'd to march to Iraq with 6,000 soldiers, while also instructing the Rashidun armies in Iraq to merge with Sa'd's forces, the forces of Arfajah, who brought 400 to 700 Azd cavalry, Jarir ibn Abdullah of al-Bajali and al-Muthanna ibn Haritha of the Banu Shayban, as those three commanders have just defeated the Sassanid vanguard in the Battle of Buwaib. Umar appointed Sa'd as the commander and placed the other three under his command. Sa'd scavenged the Rashidun soldiers left in Iraq during his marches until he managed to collect 30,000 soldiers. According to al-Basalamah, Rostam Farrokhzad, the Sassanid commander who led a massive army to confront the caliphate, deliberately marched slowly as a strategy to cause Sa'd's army to lose their patience and incite a battle. However, al-Muthanna advised Sa'd to move to the periphery of Iraq's desert and avoid moving their army deep into Sassanid territory. Sa'd agreed, and he instructed his army to move according to al-Muthanna's advice.

Sa'd engaged in routine correspondence with the central government in Medina, as Sa'd diligently wrote about all developments, major and trivial, and sent at least two messengers every day to Umar. The caliph responded with a message that forbade Sa'd from preemptive attacks.

==== Pre-battle activities ====
According to Tabari's account, the Persian faction of the Sassanid civil war that steered the policies of the young Yazdegerd III was at odds with Rostam, the commander of the empire's most powerful army. Rostam urged patience and protracted warfare instead of outright assault on the Arab troops and exchanged letters with Zuhra ibn Hawiyah with the intention of making peace. Zuhra stated that if the Sassanids converted to Islam, the Arab armies would withdraw and return only to Persia as merchants. Parvaneh Pourshariati speculates that this points to trade being a motivation behind the invasion of Persia. Tabari's narrative states that Rostam was prepared to convert in order to avoid military confrontation, but other factions in the Sassanid government refused to agree to such terms, and battle became an inevitability.

Islamic sources state that Sa'd sent a series of hostile emissaries to taunt Rostam while waiting to receive reinforcements sent by Abu Ubayda ibn al-Jarrah, who had just won the Battle of Yarmuk. The first envoy was Asim ibn Amr al-Tamimi, who was humiliated when Rostam gave him a basket filled with dirt, to which Asim responded with mocking commentary that the Sassanids "agreed to give their lands to Muslims" before returning to the Muslim army to report. Sa'd then sent al-Mughira, who gave Rostam three choices: embrace Islam, surrender peacefully, or meet on the battlefield. Al-Mughira, trying to provoke Rostam, broke a sword that had been given to him as a gift. Sa'd then sent Rib'i ibn Amir, a Bedouin chieftain with no sense of courtesy, in order to confuse the Sassanids. Rib'i entered Rostam's chamber with his mule, dirtying the tent carpet and shocking Rostam's court. He gave Rostam three choices: embrace Islam, pay jizya to the caliphate, or war. Rib'i stated that his superiors would give Rostam three days to think, and returned to Sa'd. The sending of Rib'i is depicted as causing Rostam to lose his patience, causing him to prepare his army for battle.

As Rostam's army marched to the battlefield, Sa'd sent a dozen horsemen as scouts, led by Tulayha and Amr ibn Ma'adi Yakrib, who disguised themselves as Iraqi locals. They were to ride deep into Sassanid territory and to the outskirts of Ctesiphon to gather intel regarding Rostam's forces. After two days of traveling, the scouts spotted the first vanguards of the army, which they estimated at 70,000. Tulayha and ibn Ma'adi sent the scouts to report their findings to Sa'd, while Tulayha and ibn Ma'adi continued to gather intel by themselves. They managed to trace the second and third waves, which they believed to be the center and rear of the army, numbering 100,000 and 70,000 respectively. Medieval chronicles reported that ibn Ma'adi wanted to return, having achieved the mission, but Tulayha wished to wait for one more day. Tulayha instigated a one-man raid during the night and infiltrated the rear encampment where Rostam's tent was located. He infiltrated the Sassanid camp under the cover of darkness, cut the ropes of the tents, and used torches to ignite fires within the camp. This created chaos in the camp, killing two Sassanid soldiers. As the confused army plunged into chaos, Tulayha took two horses and a captive to bring back to Sa'd. (Note: Most Hadith scholars expressed skepticism regarding the historical narration of Sayf ibn Umar) According to Tulayha, the horses belonged to Rostam. He rejoined ibn Ma'adi and they returned to Sa'd to tell him about the number of enemy forces.

The major battle in al-Qadisiyyah was preceded by a successful minor engagement against a portion of Sassanids in Uzaib.

==== The battle ====
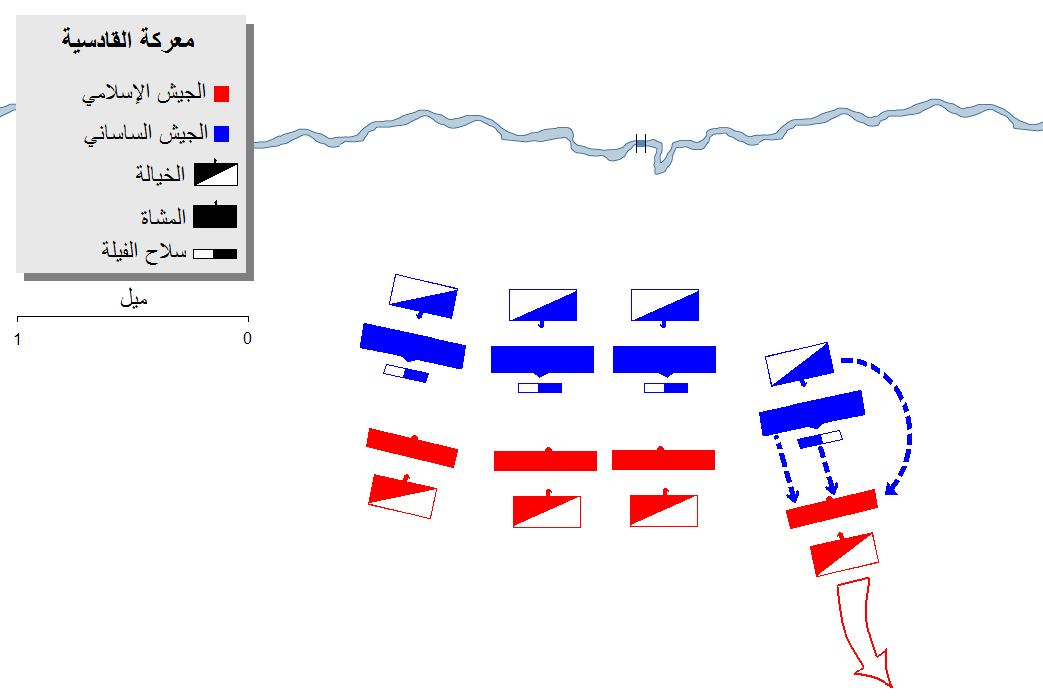
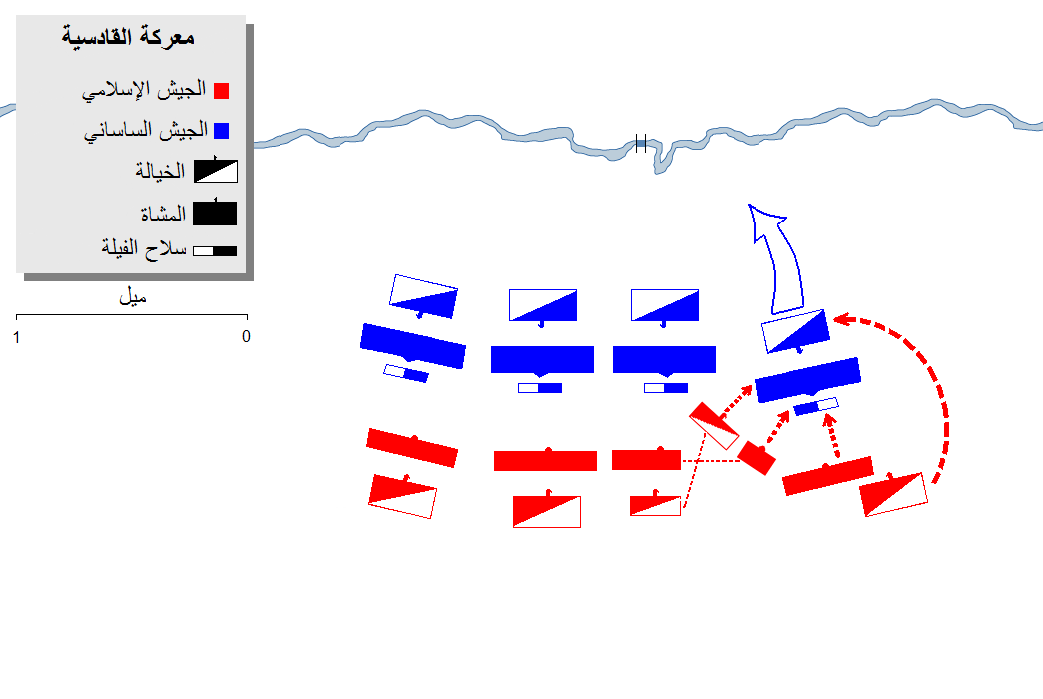
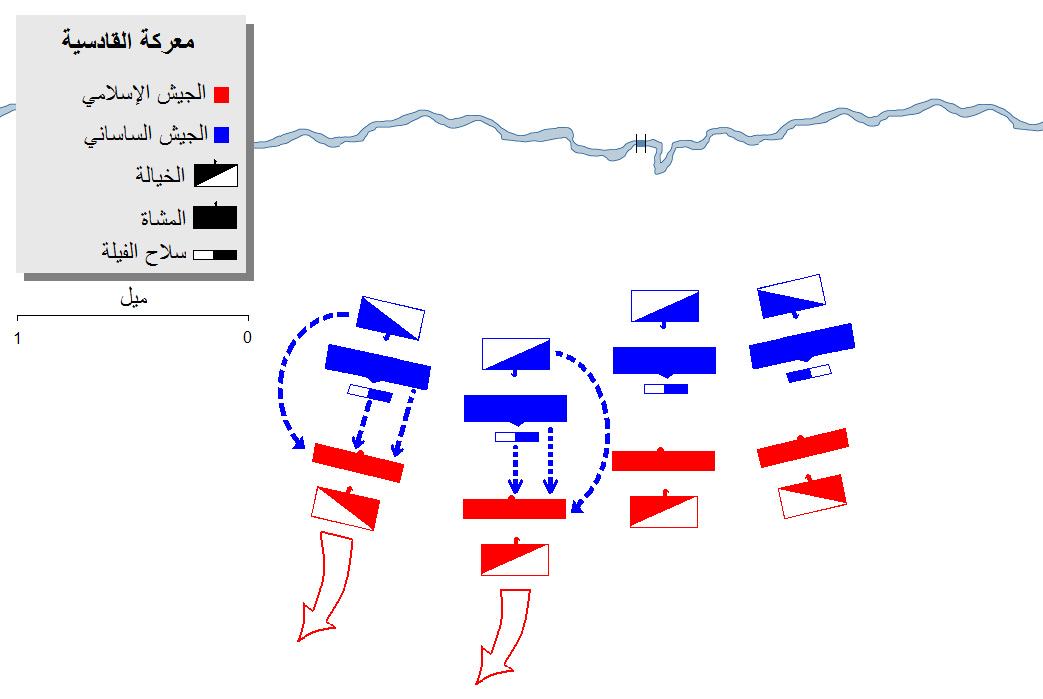
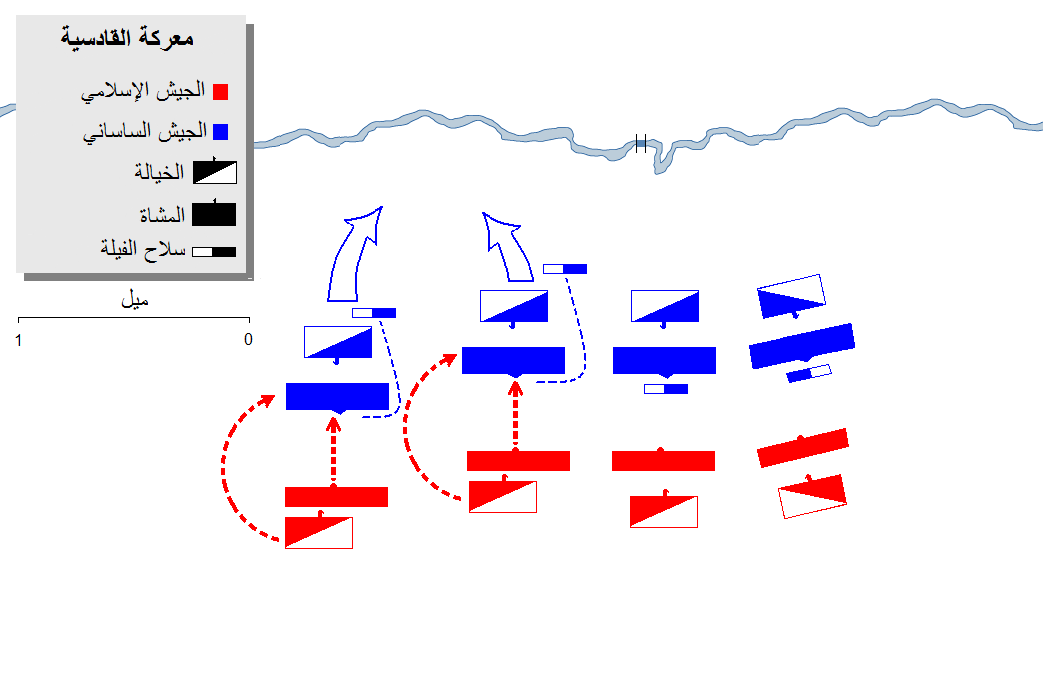
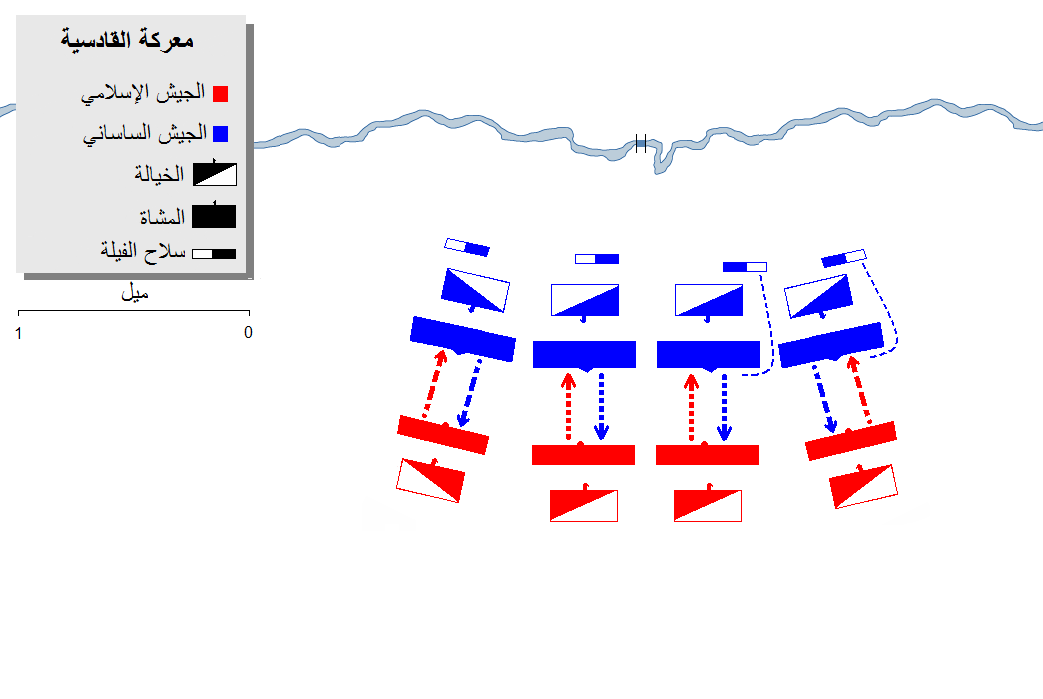
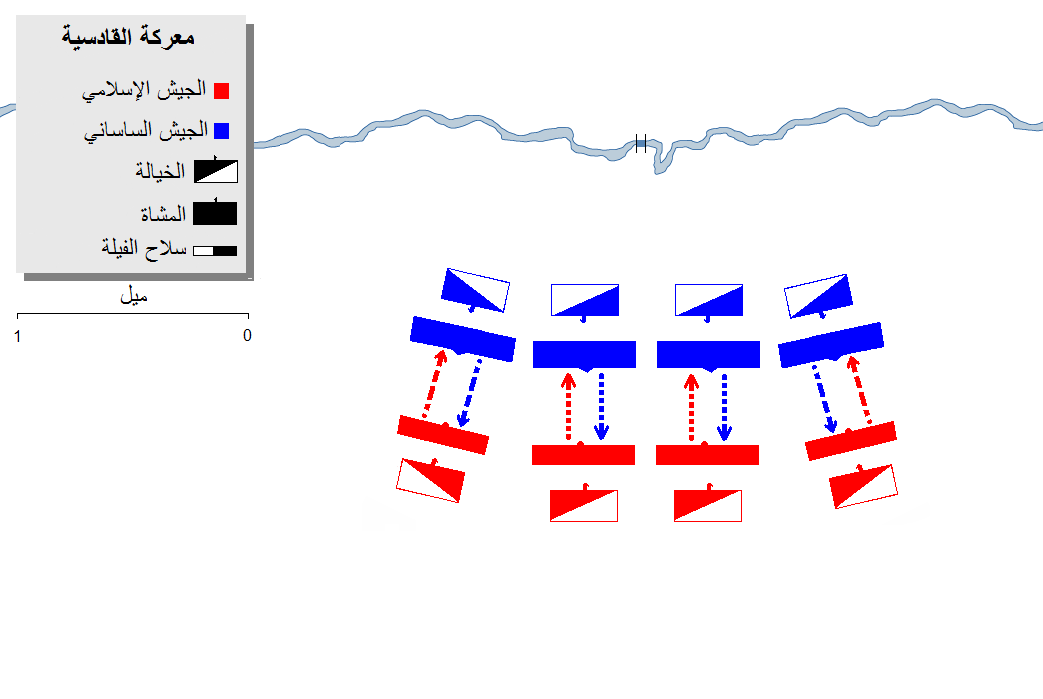
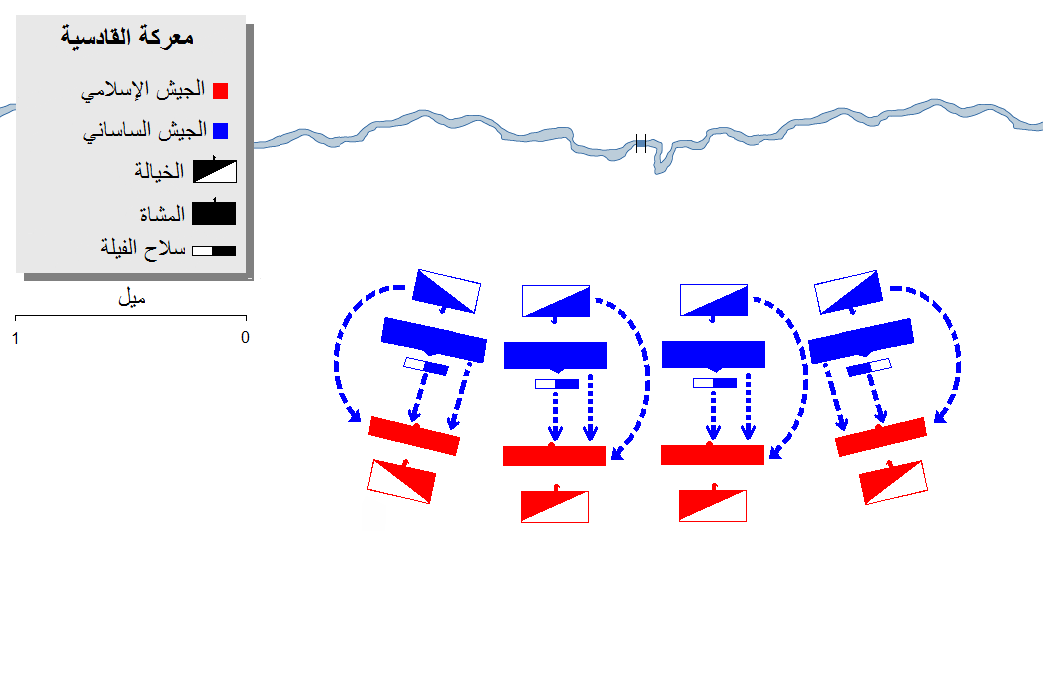
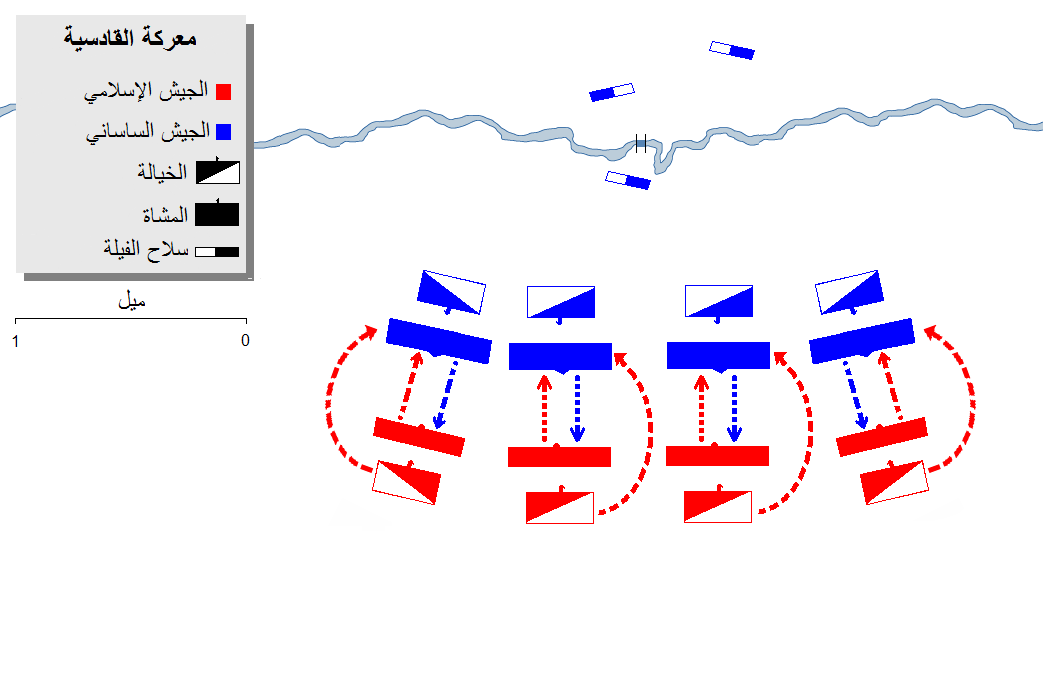
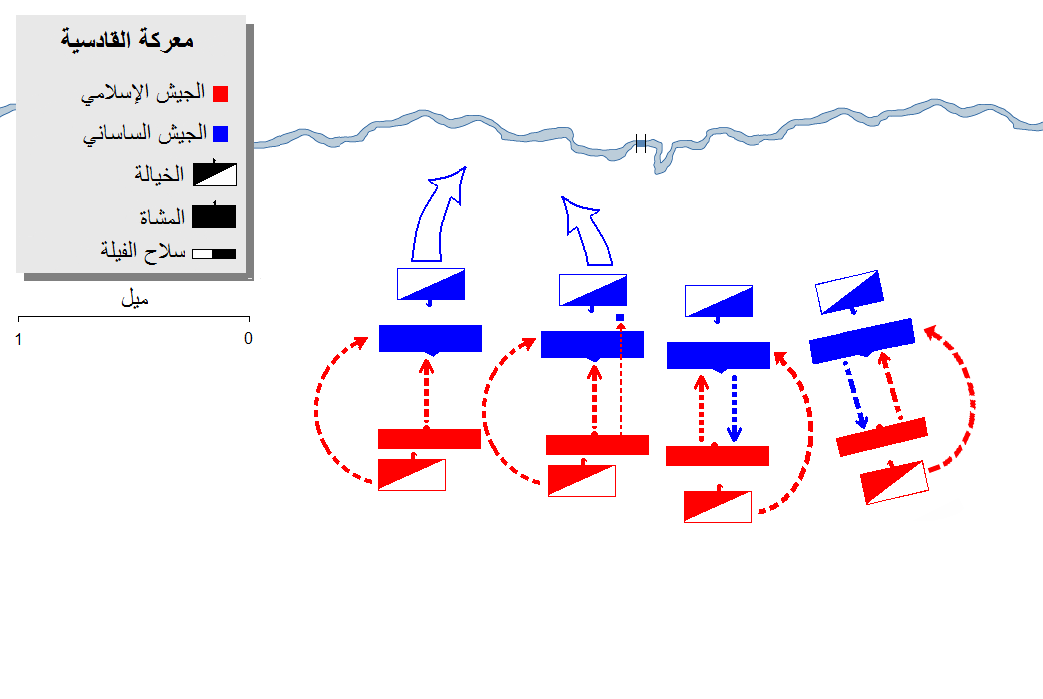
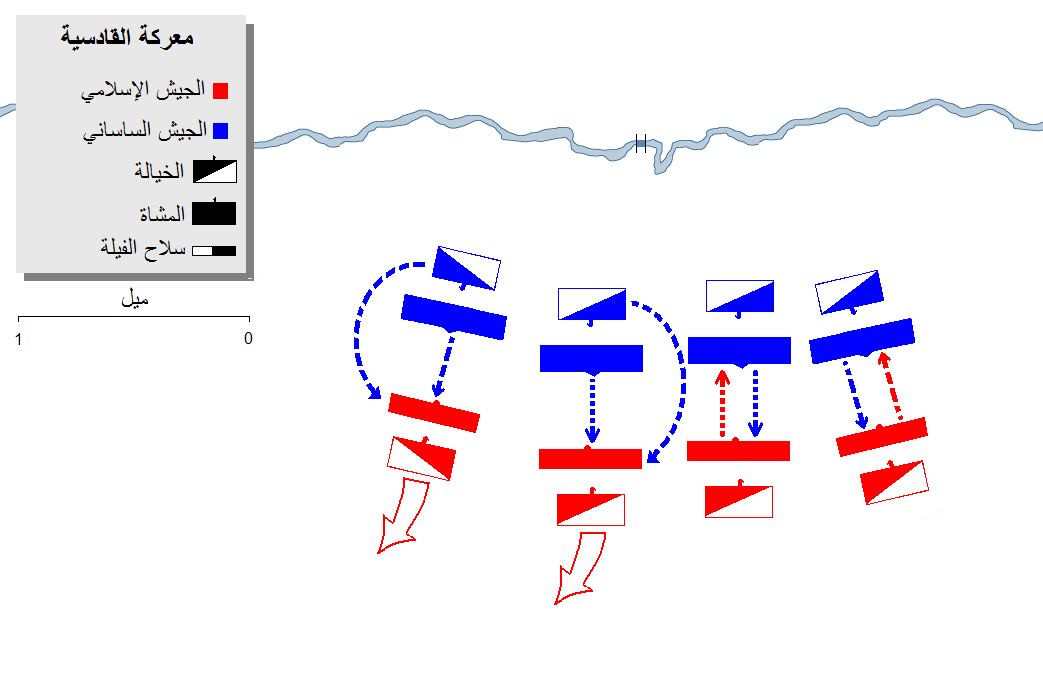
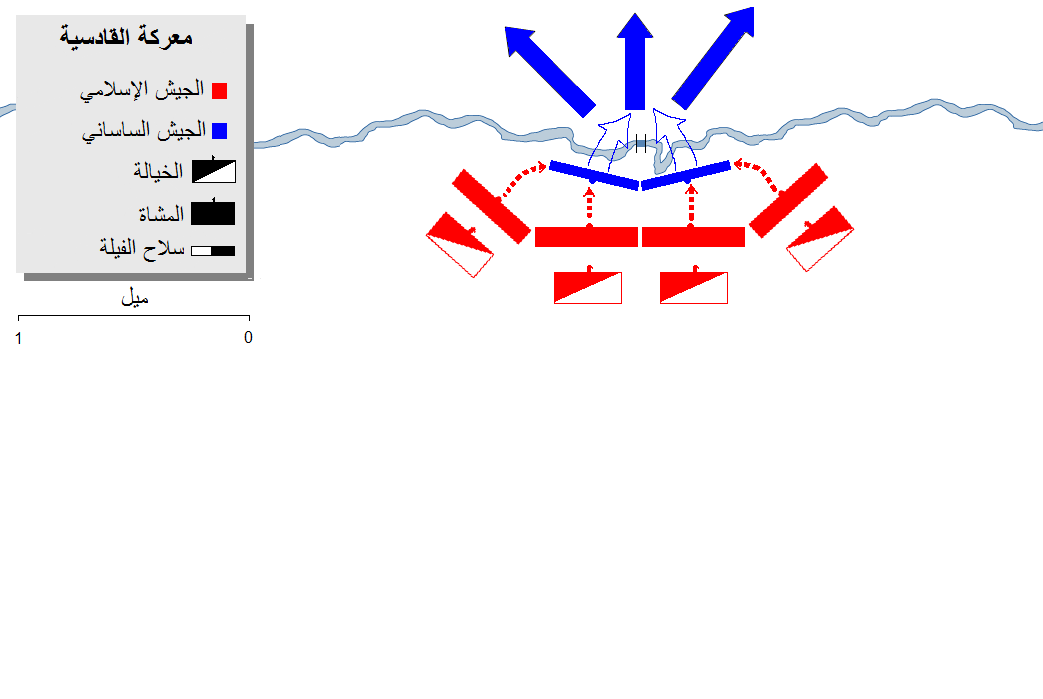
Day-by-day map of the Battle of Qadisiyyah

While the Battle of Qadisiyyah occupies an important place in Islamic history for its symbolism in Persia's fall to the Muslim army, Islamic sources provide little information about the battle itself, focusing instead on heroic tales of fighters and tribes. Modern scholars hold that most details in works like al-Tabari's History of the Prophets and Kings consist of embellishments, with narrators recounting legendary tales of their fellow tribesmen, such as Sayf ibn Umar's emphasis on the heroics of al-Qa'qa, both of them members of the Banu Tamim. The date of the battle and the size of the forces involved both vary from source to source; modern historians only assert that the Sassanids outnumbered the invaders. Scholars have proposed that the battle took place in 636 or 637, with some suggesting an earlier date of 634 or 635. While the details of the battle are unlikely to be historically accurate, the different versions of the battle do share a few commonalities, including the absence of Sa'd himself from the battlefield, attributed to hemorrhoids or pox in various sources, and the death of the enemy commander Rostam. Al-Tabari's account of the fighting has formed the basis for many modern-day attempts to reconstruct the events of the battle.

According to Sa'd al-Ubaisi's reconstruction of the battle based on al-Tabari's work, the battle occurred over four days, with Sa'd overseeing the battle from a tent overlooking the battlefield and the Sassanids relying upon their elephant corps:

1. First day, the day of Armath: Asim ibn Amr led the first clash, alongside ibn Ma'adi and the Hawazin tribe under Rabi'ah ibn Uthman. The Sassanids dispatched their heavy cavalry and elephants to cause havoc among Muslim ranks. Sa'd, who oversaw the battlefield from his tent, ordered Asim to handle the elephants. Asim dispatched a squad that, according to Al-Qurtubi, had trained for days before the battle in special anti-elephant military drills consisting of maneuvering their horses around a huge wooden elephant doll. The cavalry aimed for the elephants' alpha male, which the Muslim army recognized by its brighter skin and their perception that it was seemingly leading the other elephants. (Note: According to al-Basalamah, these cavalry managed to cut the girdle of the elephant howdah and killed the rider, scaring the elephant with their lances, causing the elephant to flee followed by other elephants.) At the end of the day, there were no elephants left, and the left wing of the Muslim army managed to stall the onslaught of the Sassanid heavy cavalry.
2. Second day, the day of Agwath: On November 17, the Muslims mobilized and fought to a deadlock as they tried to move the bodies of their fallen comrades to be buried. Suddenly, al-Qa'qa, the right-hand man of Khalid ibn al-Walid, arrived on the battlefield and burst forward with his men to penetrate the brigade of Bahman Jaduya, the Sassanid right-wing commander. They killed Bahman, leaving the Sassanid right wing leaderless for the moment. It is said that al-Qa'qa engaged in 30 personal duels on this day.
3. Third day, the day of Imash: More elephants arrived on the battlefield and the situation became dire again for the Muslims, prompting Sa'd to send urgent messages from his tent for available forces to concentrate on the elephants. Al-Qa'qa ordered massive camels to swarm the elephant flanks, while the spearmen formed spear walls in front of the elephants. According to Ibn Kathir, the Muslims who were involved in slaughtering the elephants were al-Qa'qa, Tulayha, ibn Ma'adi, Dhiraar ibn al-Azwar, Jarir ibn Abdullah al-Bajali, and Khalid ibn Urfuthah. The day ended with the elephant corps damaged beyond repair, as most of them were killed along with their riders, while many fled and became uncontrollable, trampling their own comrades and causing massive casualties to the Sassanids. The commander of the elephant corps, Jalinus, fled the battlefield after the Muslim forces gained upper hand. Sa'd ordered his men to chase and kill Jalinus, as he wanted the elephants to be permanently neutralized. A Tamim horseman named Zahra ibn Hawiyah at-Tamimi chased the elephant commander and killed him.
4. Fourth day, the day of al-Qadisiyyah: The death of Rostam shocked the Sassanids, which prompted Sa'd to order a general assault.

Multiple stories about the death of Rostam were presented in Tabari's works. According to one version of his death, there was a heavy sandstorm facing the Sassanid army on the final day of the battle. Rostam lay next to a camel to shelter himself from the storm, while some weapons, such as axes, maces, and swords had been loaded on the camel. Hilal ibn Ullafah accidentally cut the girdle of the load on the camel, not knowing that Rostam was behind and under it. The weapons fell on Rostam and broke his back, leaving him half-dead and paralyzed. Hilal beheaded Rostam and shouted that he killed Rostam. Ibn Kathir's version also states that Hilal killed Rostam. Another version of the story, attributed to Ya'qubi, states that a group including Dhiraar ibn al-Azwar, Tulayha, and Amr ibn Ma'adi Yakrib discovered Rostam's corpse. (Note: Skepticism regarding Ya'qubi's version exists)

After Rostam's death, al-Qa'qa and his Tamim cavalry were surrounded behind enemy lines, while the Muslim army carried out Sa'd's order to advance. Most of the Sassanid forces broke as the Muslim archers attacked them relentlessly. As the Sassanid casualties mounted, they were finally routed and fled towards the river of Ateeq, where they were subject to further slaughter by the Tamim cavalry led by Zahra ibn Hawiyah. (Note: The final casualties of the Sassanids are not clear, but contemporary researchers suggested from about 30,000 to "probably exceeding hundreds of thousands".)

News of the battle spread through Iraq, and many cities that had rebelled against the caliphate succumbed to it again. Sa'd immediately sent news of his victory to Medina, where the caliph gathered the city's people to inform them of the victory.

=== Crossing of Tigris and conquest of Ctesiphon ===
Shortly after the victory in Qadisiyyah, (Note: Muhammad ibn Shamil stated that medieval chroniclers listed different years for Battle of Qadisiyyah: Tabari and Sayf ibn Umar recorded it in 15 AH (636 CE), while Waqidi and Ibn Ishaq recorded it in 16 AH (637 CE).) Sa'd commanded his forces to march again, as he aimed to subdue the Sassanid capital Ctesiphon. He rearranged his army again to the five-division formation. He appointed Zuhra ibn Hawiyah to the vanguard, which marched first to the north, and replaced Khalid ibn Arfatha with Hashim ibn Utbah, his step-nephew, as his deputy. Khalid was reappointed as the rear guard commander. As the vanguard reached Borsippa, Zuhra defeated the remnants of Sassanid army under Busbuhra in the Battle of Burs. Sa'd met a force of Firuzan, which the caliphate army defeated easily. Then the forces under Sa'd marched again until they met more Sassanid resistance in Sawad. The Sasanids were defeated after their leader, Syahriyar, was defeated in a duel by a Muslim soldier named Abu Nabatah Naim al-Raji, who was given the crown and bracelets of Syahriyar as spoils of war.

Location of Behrasir (Veh-Ardashir and Seleucia) on the west bank of the Tigris

After the town was pacified, Sa'd continued to march again until they pacified one of the Sassanid capital's suburbs, Behrasir. Sa'd used the city as a military headquarters, while he sent smaller companies to gather intel. These small raiding parties did not find any hostile forces but brought 100,000 dirhams seized from local farmers. This prompted Sa'd to inform the caliph about his soldiers' conduct. Umar replied by forbidding the seizure of money and instructed the soldiers to instead offer the people a choice between converting to Islam or paying jizya. Sa'd sent Salman the Persian to offer the locals these two choices. This was received well by the locals, except the citizens of Bahurashir, who resisted behind their walls. Sa'd besieged the city and built 20 trebuchets to subdue the suburb. The city garrison sent raiding forces outside the wall to stop the trebuchets. Their efforts were repelled by Zuhra, who suffered injuries in protecting the machines. The siege continued until the garrison of Bahurashir suffered from supply and food shortages, which caused them to abandon Bahurashir and cross the Tigris River toward al-Mada'in. After the garrison left, Sa'd entered the abandoned Bahurashir.

The Tigris was undergoing a heavy tide at the time and crossing it without boats was impossible for the Rashidun forces. Sa'd was forced to wait until they could cross the river. He grew frustrated, as he was informed by locals that Yazdegerd III was going to move the treasury from al-Mada'in to Hulwan. That morning, Sa'd changed his mind and told the army that he was willing to take the risk, and the entire force should cross the river with their mounts despite the high tide. Sa'd reasoned that they needed to subdue al-Mada'in immediately and deny Yazdegerd any chance to use his wealth to build another army. The soldiers were hesitant, as the river torrents were fierce, but as Sa'd motivated them they complied, and one by one they plunged themselves into the river and crossed it. Ibn Kathir reported that the Sassanids in al-Mada'in castle yelled "Crazy! They are crazy!", unable to believe that the Rasidun army attempted to cross the torrent without boats. The Sassanids attempted to intercept the crossing by sending their cavalries, but Asim on the vanguard easily repelled them by instructing his archers to aim for their horses' eyes, causing the blinded horses to move uncontrollably. The Sassanids abandoned their horses and ran on foot. As they ran, Asim commanded his forces to catch them. By the time they reached the Sassanid capital, Sa'd recovered from his sickness.

==== Wealth of Yazdegerd ====
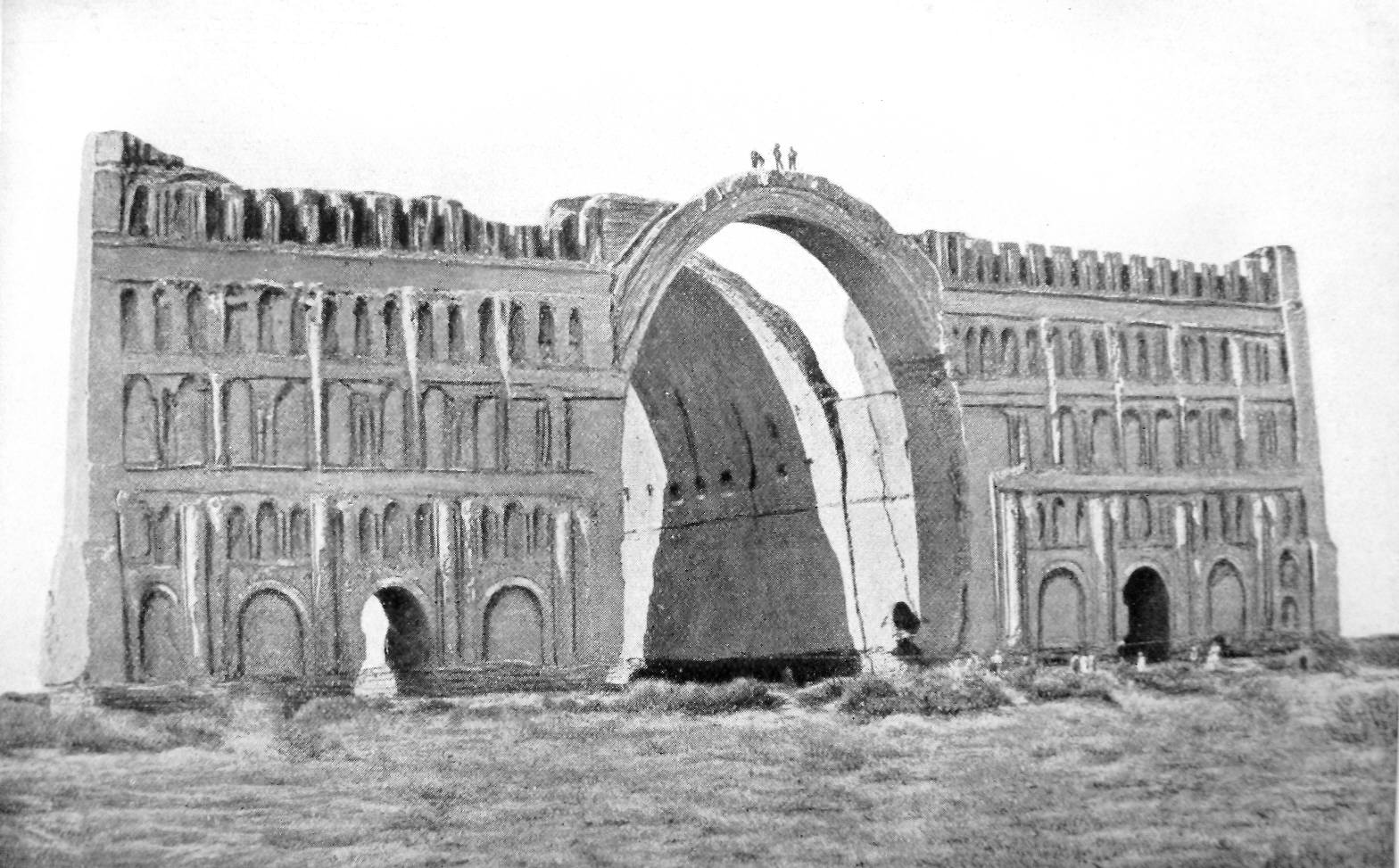
Taq Kasra or Ctesiphon palace ruin, with the arch in the centre, 1864

When the whole army had crossed the river, they immediately chased after the Sassanids who had fled to al-Mada'in. The army was unable to find them, and Yazdegerd had evacuated his entire family and much of his property from the city. The army managed to secure al-Mada'in's treasury, and also found Yazdegerd's crown and gown in a sack loaded on a mule. They were immediately confiscated by Zuhra, who brought them to Sa'd.

They found the palace abandoned. Sa'd sent Salman to preach Islam in the subdued megalopolis. In the month of Safar, he gathered his troops to carry out Friday prayers in the palace. According to Ibn Shamil, this was the first Friday prayer established in country of Iraq, as Sa'd had intended to live in this palace. Sa'd appointed Amr ibn Amr al-Muzani to manage the spoils, and Salman to distribute a fifth of the spoils to the soldiers. Because the army consisted of mounted soldiers, each soldier got at least 12,000 silver dirhams. The rest were sent to Medina with Bayir ibn al-Khasasiyah.

When the wealth of the Sassanids reached Medina, Umar gave the golden bracelet of Yazdegerd to Suraqa bin Malik, a Kinana tribesman from Banu Midhlaj, as according to a hadith prophesied by Muhammad during the Hegira, Muhammad promised Suraqa the bracelets of Yazdegerd.

=== Governorate in Kufa ===
Sassanid Khuzestan, which invaded during Sa'd tenure in Iraq

Shortly after Sa'd conquered al-Mada'in, Umar ordered him to stabilize the conquered area before chasing down the Sassanid forces that fled to the mountains.

Sa'd heard that the people of Mosul had gathered at Tikrit under a figure named al-Antioch. Al-Antioch had gathered some Byzantine men as his allies, along with a man named Syaharijah and Arab Christian warriors from the tribes of Iyad, Taghlib, and an-Nimr. Sa'd wrote a letter to Umar about this news, and Umar replied by ordering him to launch a preemptive attack on Mosul. Sa'd appointed Abdullah ibn Mu'tam as the commander of the forces set to attack Mosul, with Rib'i bin al-Afkal al-Inazi as the vanguard. Sa'd appointed Al-Harith ibn Hassan on the right wing, Furat ibn Hayyan on the left wing, and Hani ibn Qais and Arfajah on the cavalry, with Arfajah the first to reach Tikrit. After they were finished in Tikrit, ibn Mu'tam sent Rabi'i ibn al-Afkal and Arfajah to subdue Nineveh and Mosul before the news about Antiqa's defeat in Tikrit spread. Arfajah and ibn Mu'tam forced a surrender from both cities and subjected them to jizya.

As Yazdegerd fled to Hulwan, he gathered soldiers and followers in every territory passed until he mustered more than 100,000 soldiers and appointed Mihran as their commander. According to John Paul C. Nzomiwu, Yazdegerd raised this massive army from Hulwan because he could not accept the defeat in al-Qadisiyyah. The army of Mihran dug a large ditch around them as a defense and dwelt in that place with a number of troops, supplies, and equipment. Sa'd requested further instruction from Umar, and the caliph ordered Sa'd to stay in al-Mada'in and appoint Hashim ibn Utbah as the leader of the troops to attack Jalula. Sa'd executed these instructions and sent Hashim to lead the Rashidun troops to engage Mihran forces in the Battle of Jalula. Al-Qa'qa was appointed as vanguard, Malik ibn Si'r as right wing, Amr ibn Malik on the left, and Amr ibn Murrah al-Juhani as rearguard. The Rashidun troops sent to Jalula numbered 12,000 soldiers, which included veteran warriors from the muhajirun and Ansar from the tribal chiefs of the interior Arabs. It is said that the Muslims managed to seize spoils in the form of treasures, weapons, gold and silver which amounted to almost as much as the treasures they found in al-Mada'in and more than they received from Ctesiphon.

After the operation in Jalula, Umar ordered Hashim ibn Utbah to stay in Jalula, while al-Qa'qa should continue to pursue Yazdegerd to Hulwan. Al-Qa'qa clashed against another Sassanid force in Hulwan led by Kihran ar-Razi, who al-Qa'qa personally slaid in battle, while another Sassanid commander, Fairuzan, managed to escape. As Yazdegerd raised further resistance forces, Sa'd's troops under Arfajah chased them, sending the vanguard led by a Tamim warrior named Hurqus ibn Zuhayr as-Sa'di (known as Dhu al-Khuwaishirah at-Tamimi, the first Kharijite in history.) to face them. Hurqus managed to crush Yazdegerd's army under Hormuzan in Ahvaz (now known as Hormizd-Ardashir). The massive spoils of war which were acquired earlier now became a major problem for Sa'd due to complaints received by the caliph regarding Sa'd's uneven distribution of the spoils from Jalula. The complaint caused the caliph to recall Sa'd for questioning, while the caliph ordered a major investigation regarding the accusation towards Sa'd.

==== Founding of Kufa ====
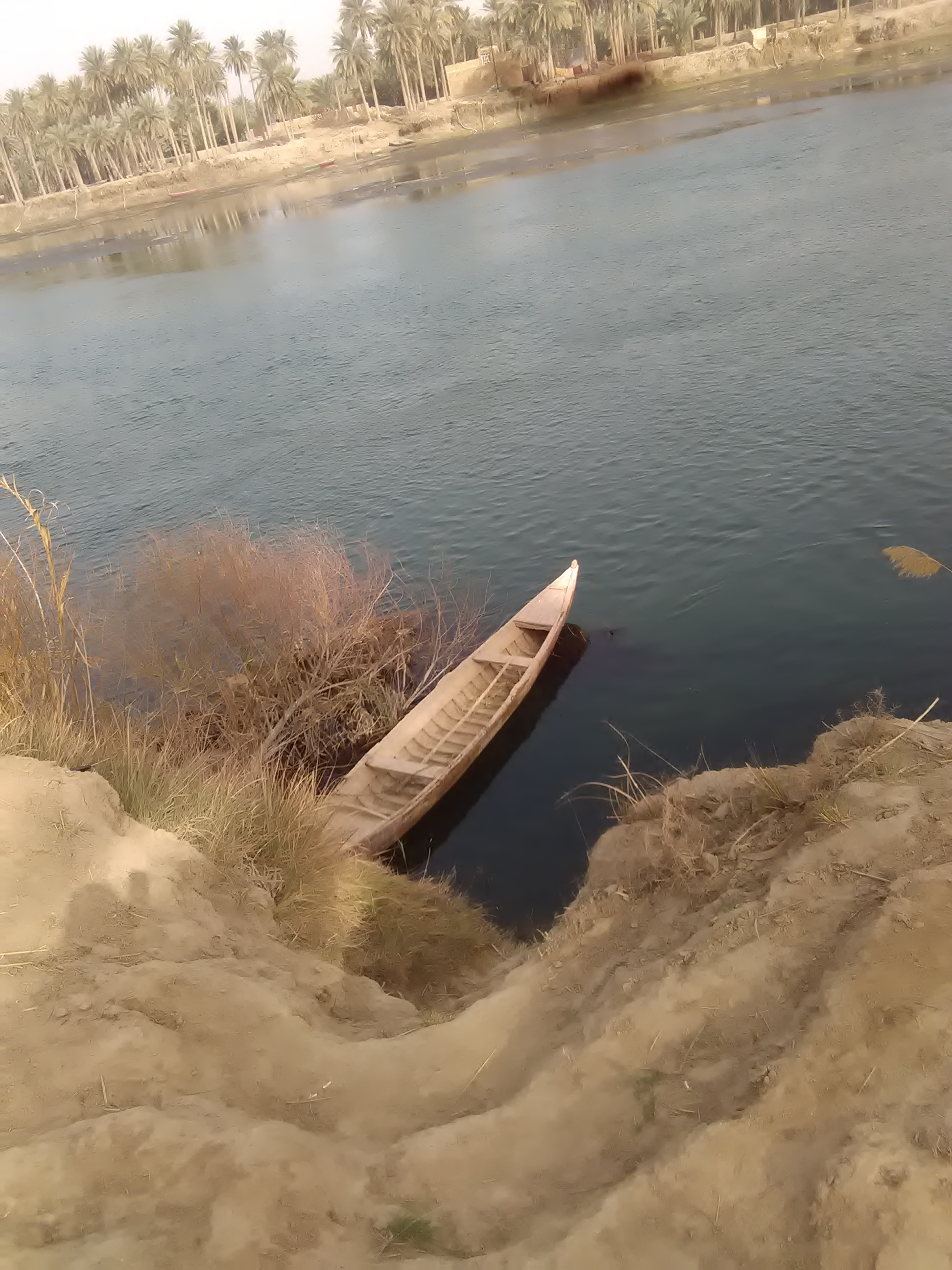
Euphrates river near Kufa

After the Arab armies had settled in al-Mada'in, Umar learned that many of the soldiers who had settled in Iraq were ill. The soldiers reported that they were sick because they resided "in a place that was not fit for camels". Later historians theorized that the soldiers in al-Mada'in became sick because they were not used to the non-desert climate of al-Mada'in, which was characterized by medieval chroniclers as a highly urbanized megalopolis with dense forest features. Umar sent Ammar ibn Yasir and Hudhayfah ibn al-Yaman to assist in Iraq and began searching places fit for the Arab army's settlement. Utbah ibn Ghazwan and Arfajah built a garrison town in Basra, while Sa'd moved towards what would become Kufa. He transported and dismantled walls and military structures from al-Mada'in to build a new garrison city or misr. The new misr was formally called Jund al-Kufah, which was a complex for the Muslim soldiers who settled in that area permanently along with their families. Sa'd made Kufa his permanent headquarters.

After Sa'd settled into Kufa, he instructed Hashim ibn Utbah to bring his forces towards locations in Khuzestan centered around Ahvaz to face Hormuzan, a fugitive commander who survived the Battle of al-Qadisiyyah. Utbah ibn Gahzwan also prepared his troops from Basra to the assist forces of Hashim. They won the battle and forced Hormuzan to flee from the area. Later, Umar learned that Yazdegerd mustered another army to attack the city of Basra. The caliph ordered Sa'd to send his troops to Ahvaz under the command of Al-Nu'man ibn Muqrin to confront this threat. Umar ordered Sa'd to appoint Jarir ibn Abdillah al-Bajili, Jarir ibn Abdillah al-Humairi, Suwaid ibn al-Muqarrin, and Abdullah bin Dzi as-Sahmain as field commanders. Umar wrote another letter to Abu Musa al-Ash'ari in Basra to send troops to Ahvaz under the command of Sahl ibn Adi, and instructed him to include powerful fighters such as al-Bara' ibn Malik, Asim ibn 'Amr, Mujaz'ah ibn Thawr as-Sadusi, Ka'b ibn Sur, Arfajah ibn Harthamah, Hudhayfah al-Bariqi, Abdurrahman ibn Sahl, al-Hushain ibn Ma'bad under the command of Abu Saburah ibn Abi Ruhm. This army successfully defeated the Sassanids and conquered most of Khuzestan.

Hormuzan once again gathered a group of Sassanid forces on the plain of Masabzan. Sa'd informed Umar of this, and Umar sent an army led by Dhiraar ibn al-Khattab, Al-Hudhayl Al-Asadi, and Abd Allah ibn Wahb al-Rasibi. This force successfully defeated the Sassanids in Masabzan and captured one of their commanders. Sa'd named Dhiraar an administrator of the Masabzan area.

Umar then ordered the troops in Kufa to assist the army in Emesa, where Abu Ubaydah and Khalid ibn al-Walid were besieged by a Christian Arab army under the command of Heraclius. Sa'd sent al-Qa'qa and several thousand cavalries as reinforcements. As the besiegers of Emesa were repelled, Umar ordered al-Qa'qa to return to Iraq.

==== Dismissal from command ====
In 638, Umar sent Muhammad ibn Maslamah to Kufa, as he heard of scandals involving Sa'd. Sa'd, the governor of Kufa, had built a public citadel next to his own house. The noise from the nearby market was so deafening that Sa'd had locked the gate to the citadel, which prompted the caliph to send ibn Maslamah to destroy the gate, which he did by setting fire to it. He refused all of Sa'd's offers of hospitality, and handed him a missive from Umar reminding him that the citadel should be available to the public, suggesting that he move his house. According to Asad Ahmed, the caliph also dispatched several intelligence officers, including a spy named Hashim ibn Walid ibn al-Mughira, to investigate Sa'd's conduct. They found unanimous support and positive impressions from the Kufa residents towards Sa'd, except from the tribes of Bajila and Abs.

In 642, ibn Maslamah was again sent to investigate complaints of Kufa's citizens towards Sa'd. Ibn Maslamah visited all the local mosques and heard the public's complaints. Nearly everyone expressed satisfaction with Sa'd's conduct as governor, but there was an accusation that he did not lead the prayers correctly and spent too much time hunting. Ibn Maslamah took Sa'd and his accusers back to Umar. Sa'd was proven innocent while the accuser was only spreading rumors, but Umar still replaced Sa'd as governor. According to al-Basalamah, this was because Umar wanted to minimize any potential scandals. He admitted that he trusted Sa'd, as they did not find any proven misconduct during their investigation. According to Asad Q. Ahmed, the complaints towards Sa'd were most likely due to the jealousy of several clans in Kufa towards Sa'd for his apparent high position as overlord of Iraq and for his closeness to his favorite general and nephew, Hashim ibn Utba, which was viewed as nepotism.

Later, on the eve of the Battle of Nahavand, Umar gathered a war council consisting of Sa'd, Uthman, Ali, Talha, Zubayr, and Abbas ibn Abd al-Muttalib.

Some narrations state that although Umar removed him from his post as governor, he recommended that the caliph who succeeded him reinstall Sa'd, since he had not removed Sa'd due to any treachery. Later, Sa'd was one of six people nominated by him for the third caliph. Umar left a will asking the third caliph to reappoint Sa'd as Governor of Kufa, which was done by Uthman ibn al-Affan, who dismissed al-Mughira from Kufa and reappointed Sa'd as Governor. Several years later, Sa'd was involved in a quarrel with Abdullah ibn Masud, as he could not pay his debt to the latter. This quarrel caused Uthman to remove Sa'd from his post and appoint al-Walid ibn Uqba as his replacement.

=== First Muslim civil wars ===
When the First Fitna broke out, Sa'd convinced many surviving Companions of Muhammad, including Ibn Abbas, Abdullah ibn Umar, Muhammad ibn Maslamah, Anas ibn Malik, Al-Qa'qa' ibn Amr al-Tamimi, and Abu Ayyub al-Ansari, to remain neutral in the strife. Sa'd, along with ibn Umar and ibn Maslamah, rejected pleas for assistance from the factions during the war. Many resented this extremely influential yet pacifistic faction led by Sa'd, as some thought their inactivity during the strife prevented a decisive result in the conflict. Sa'd's son Umar ibn Sa'd was one of his father's critics.

Sa'd outlived all of the other ten to whom Paradise was promised and died at the age of eighty, around the year 674. Judging by the portion of the last zakat he paid, Saad's wealth measured 250,000 dirhams on the day he died.

== Legacy ==
As a figure with a long career in early Islamic history and its conquests, Sa'd left a rich legacy as a military figure and as an honored companion of Muhammad; legends surrounding him served as influences on China's Islamic tradition. Sa'd's characterization as a hero of Islam and the Arabs was used by Saddam Hussein to link himself to the conqueror of Iraq.

=== Islamic scholarship ===
Sunni Muslims regard Sa'd as one of the ten to whom Paradise was promised, and he is famed for his participation in Badr and Uhud. Various verses of the Quran are said to have been inspired by him, including ayah 8 of Al-Ankabut, which commenters have suggested was inspired by Sa'd's steadfastness in Islam, and Luqman, verse 15, which urged Sa'd to be easy on his parents, as Islam emphasizes filial piety.

Various hadiths are attributed to Sa'd, including fifteen hadiths in Sahih Al-Bukhari and Muslim. The Musnad Ahmad ibn Hanbal contains 177 hadiths attributed to him. Various prominent narrators such as Abdullah ibn Umar, Aisha, and Abdullah ibn Abbas also narrated from Sa'd, as Dhahabi recorded.

Several hadiths involving Sa'd have been used to explain the Islamic law of inheritance that restricts bequests to one-third of the estate when the deceased is survived by an heir. This law, which is not described in the Qu'ran, is largely based on a tradition in which a gravely ill Sa'd requests Muhammad's guidance in determining how much of his wealth he should bequeath to charity. The tradition has multiple variants, with some of them involving Umar instead of Muhammad, and may be an Umayyad-era retroactive justification for the policy.

Sa'd earned part of his income via muzara'a, a business model similar to sharecropping whereby the product was shared according to fixed ratio.

=== Architecture ===
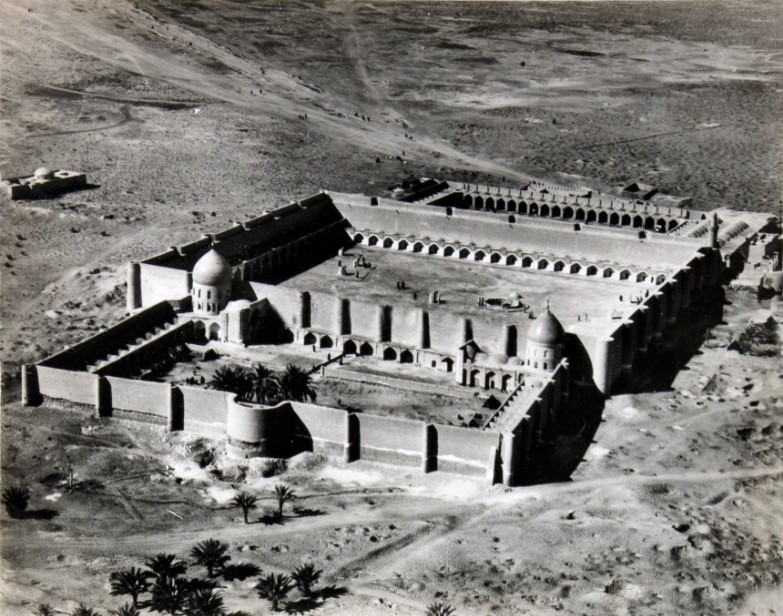
Great mosque of Kufa in 1915

Sa'd is credited with the foundation of the city of Kufa adjacent to Al-Hirah, which was founded by the Lakhmid king Al-Nu'man III ibn al-Mundhir. The main roads of Kufa were twenty yards wide and thirty to forty-five feet long. According to Imamuddin, the town reached its zenith during the time of Umar, who called it Ras Islam. It was originally built as a permanent settlement for the Muslim army in Iraq. Sa'd had many public service structures built in the city, such as a canal named after him and a congregational mosque constructed for Friday prayers. It could accommodate 40,000 people and had a wide veranda 100 yards long in front of the congregational hall. Its Dar al Imara structure was located south of its qibla wall. The Kufa grand mosque had later historical significance, as it became the place where the Hasan–Muawiya treaty occurred, where Hassan ibn Ali abdicated the position of caliph and recognized Mu'awiyah as the next caliph.

Ibn Shamil's al-Bidaya wa Nihaya named Sa'd the first to lead Friday prayers in Iraq, stating that he transformed the main hall of the palace of Ctesiphon into a congregational prayer area for the Muslim conquering forces.

=== Military ===
Islamic scholars praise Sa'd for his two most important battles in Iraq: the battle of Qadisiyyah and the pacification of Ctesiphon. Bashamil considered the battle of al-Qadisiyyah the beginning of the permanent entrenchment of the caliphate's presence in Iraq, as almost all Iraqi cities that broke away from the caliphate when Khalid ibn al-Walid departed immediately succumbed to Sa'd. Sayf ibn Umar highlighted the effects of the battle beyond Iraq and Persian soils, reporting that the Arab tribe in Aden Abyan, Yemen, closely monitored the outcome in al-Qadisiyyah, believing that the result of the battle would even affect Yemen.

After the conquest of Ctesiphon, Sa'd sent most of the enormous spoils of war to Medina. The army commanded by Sa'd seized another enormous sum of wealth after the Battle of Jalula; according to Asad Ahmed, the spoils of Jalula were the biggest seizure during the conquest of Persia.

=== Alleged visit to Asia ===
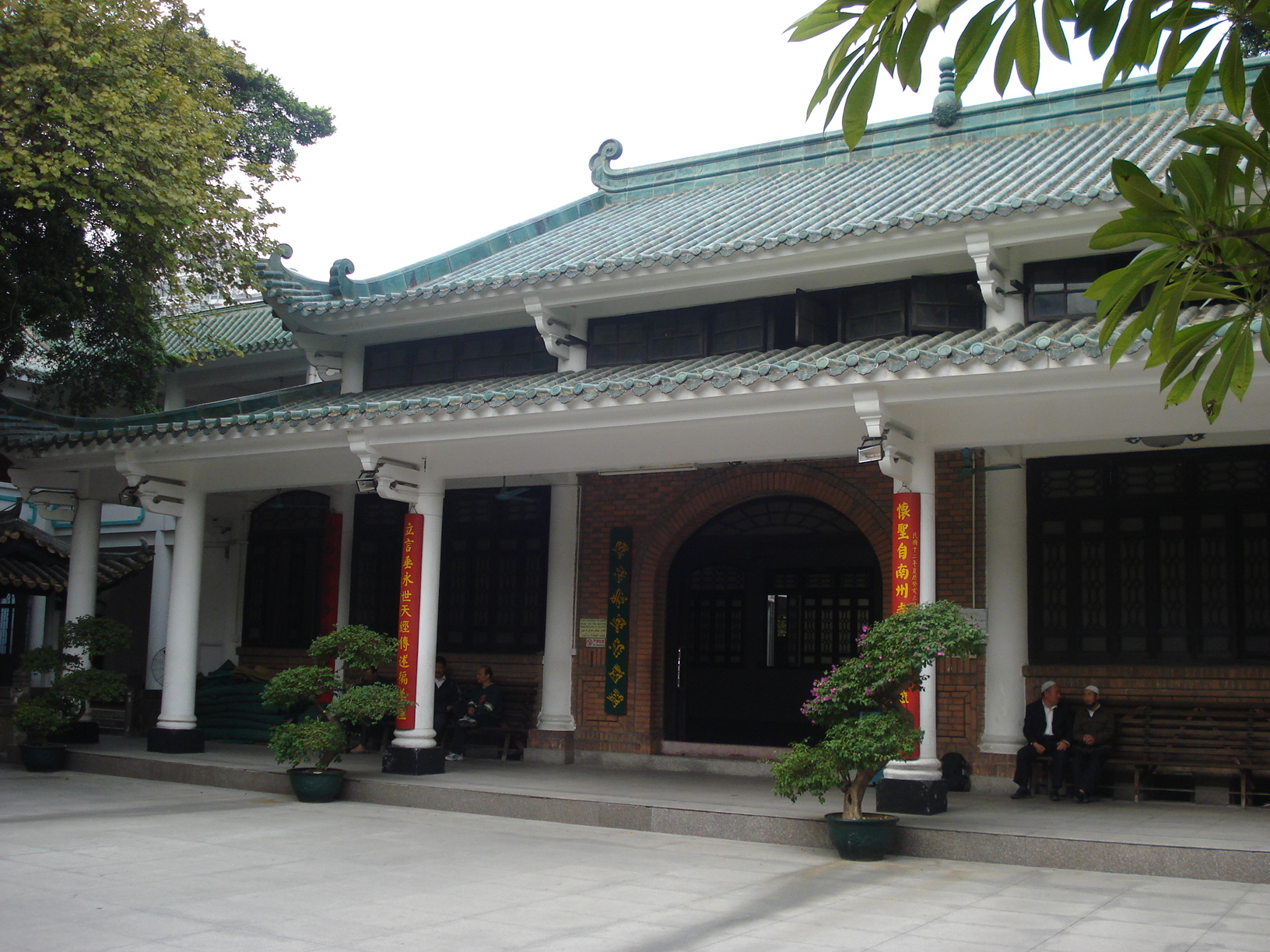
Huaisheng Mosque in Guangzhou, China. Claimed by locals to have been built by Sa'd ibn Abi Waqqas.

Sa'd has been traditionally credited by Hui Muslims with introducing Islam to China. According to their tradition, Sa'd came to China as an ambassador in 650 during the reign of Emperor Gaozong of Tang. The 17th century Hui scholar Liu Ch'ih instead credited Sa'd with introducing Islam to China in 616 after he moved to China from Abyssinia.

Despite several Chinese claimants as Sa'd's descendants, the claims that Sa'd visited China remains controversial among scholars. According to Donald Leslie, "Chinese Muslim tradition, with sources from the 14th century and later, has the Sahâba Sa’d ibn Abi Waqqâs, maternal cousin of Muhammad, conqueror of Persia and founder of Kufâh, sent with other envoys in 628, but it is highly unlikely that envoys were actually sent to China during Muhammad's lifetime. Tabarî writes of envoys to Persia, Ethiopia and elsewhere, but does not mention China. We should note that besides the famous Guangzhou tomb for Waqqâs in China, there is one also in Medina, far more convincing". L. C. Harris remarked that most Arab historians reject the notion due to lack of records for such a journey by Sa'd. Maurice Gajan speculates that the local traditions about Sa'd are linked to some Muslim traders from the West Asia establishing small communities in the coastal towns of Quanzhou, Guangzhou, and Yangzhou during early medieval periods. Sa'd is nonetheless an important figure in Chinese Muslims' cultural heritage, particularly the mosques and tombs that are attributed to him by local Muslims.

In Central Asia, his name is often transcribed as Saduakas (Sadvakas), which is a very common name among the nomadic peoples of Central Asia.

== Description ==
Sa'd was born in Mecca in 595. His father was Abu Waqqas Malik ibn Uhayb ibn Abd Manaf ibn Zuhrah from the Banu Zuhrah clan of the Quraysh tribe. Sa'd's mother was Hamnah bint Sufyan ibn Umayya ibn Abd Shams ibn Abd Manaf. Sa'd was related to Muhammad, whose mother Aminah came from the Banu Zuhrah. Sa'd had many children, including sons named Umar and Amir and a daughter named A'isha.

He had a short or medium stature according to medieval Arab sources, dark skin, and a pug nose. He was said to have a muscular build.

Sa'd was known for his skill in mounted archery, and was known as the first Muslim archer after the Expedition of Ubaydah ibn al-Harith. Muslim scholars viewed Sa'd's archery skills in this battle as being "gifted (by God)". It is said that after the Battle of Uhud, his peers praised him for his heroism and for securing Muhammad's safety.

=== Leadership ===
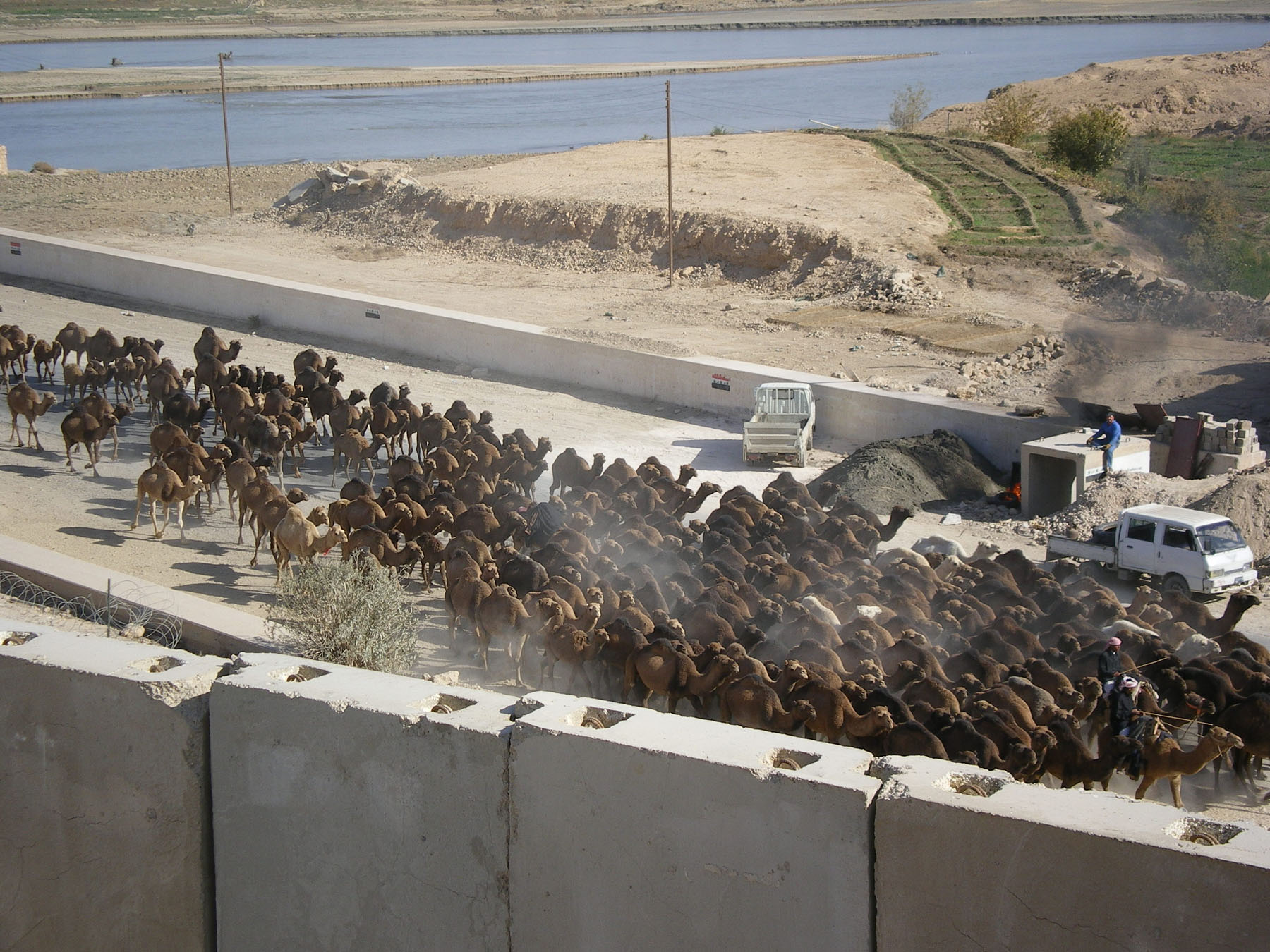
Camel herds in Iraq. Camel hordes were used in al-Qadisiyyah to stamp out Sassanid elephant corps.

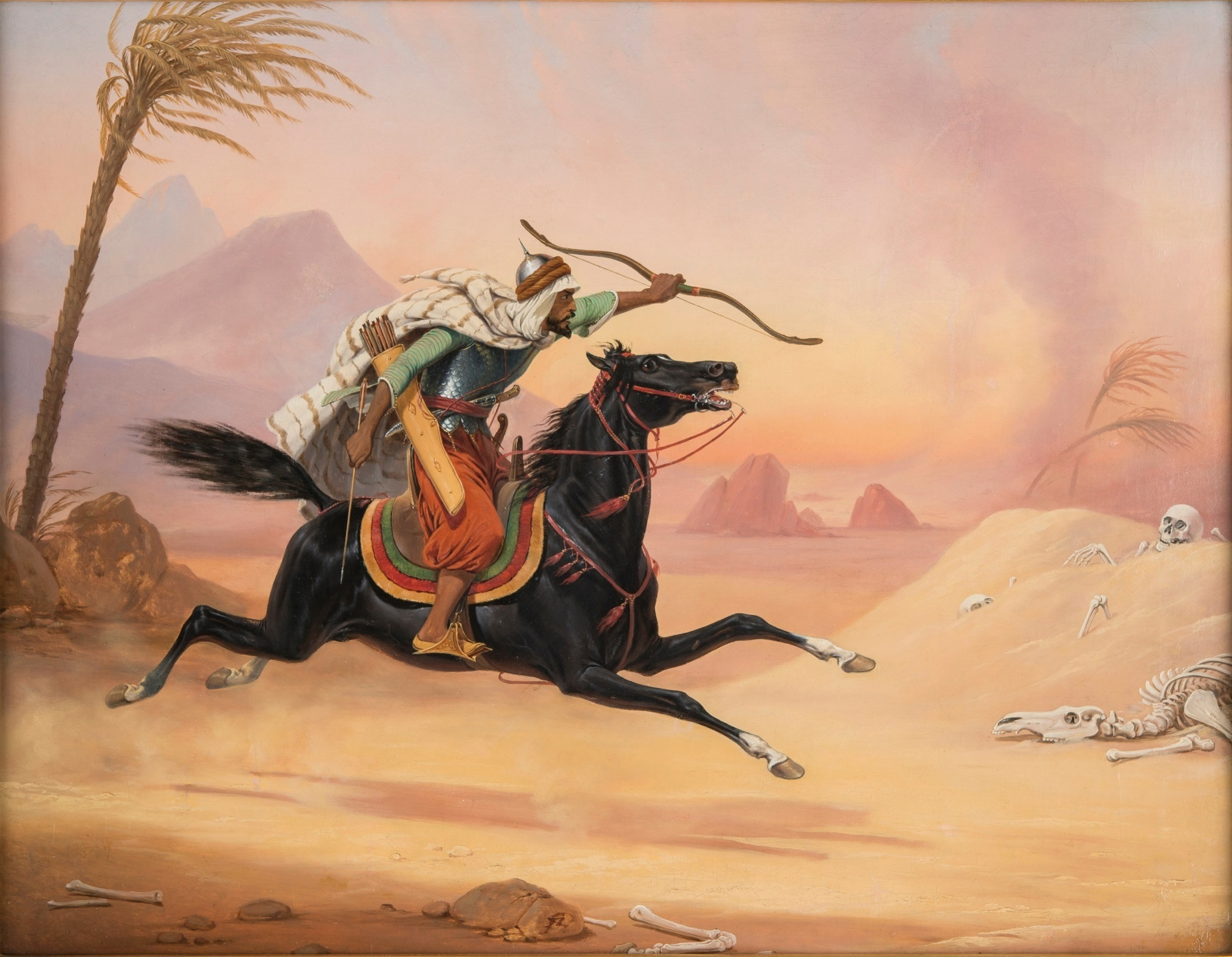
Depiction of Arab Faris archer, by January Suchodolski (1836)

During his tenure as the commander of the army in Iraq, Sa'd was a strategic command figure, a far cry from his younger days during the era of Muhammad as frontline hero. Imamuddin regarded Sa'd as wise ruler during his governorate in Iraq. Asad Q. Ahmed remarks that Sa'd was politically astute during his duty in Iraq as he engaged in active roles against Umar over financial and political matters.

Sa'd relayed all progression of the frontline to Umar. Common views usually give Sa'd credit for the victory in Qadisiyyah, though scholarship focuses more on the figures behind his success in that battle. Sa'd's leadership was characterized by his liberal stance towards lower officers, as Sa'd usually give his subordinates freedom to express their ideas, whether by relying on the wisdom of strategy experts such as al-Muthanna, Asim, al-Mughira and Arfajah or by allowing decisive commanders like Tulayha, al-Qa'qa, and Amr ibn Ma'adi Yakrib to mount their own initiatives during battle. Sa'd's leadership style allowed creative field commanders like al-Qa'qa to utilize their creativity.

Another factor for Sa'd's victory in al-Qadisiyyah was the quality of his archers, as Rashidun archers were typically precise and powerful shooters, akin to Byzantine archers in the Battle of Callinicum. This powerful archery style allowed Rashidun archers to easily overcome Sassanid archers who preferred the rapid, showering Panjagan archery technique, as the former packed more punch and range than the latter during the Muslim conquest of Persia. Sassanid arrows failed to pierce Rashidun armor or shields, while the arrows of Muslim archers were able to penetrate the mail and double cuirass of Sassanid warriors. In short, many of Sa'd's brilliant victories against Persians were due to the brilliance of his subordinates.

However, al-Basalamah remarked that Sa'd himself was inventive in warfare, and highlighted how Sa'd departed from the orthodox five division formation into the thinner six division variation or camelier corps. Sa'd also trained his cavalry wings to act like a pendulum, an implementation of the karr wa farr (engage-and-disengage) classical Arabian warfare strategy, where the cavalry charged and retreated to their starting position, with the other cavalry wing reacting in the opposite direction. Muslim scholars also highlighted Sa'd's emissary exchange with Rostam, successfully provoked Rostam to act first and draw his army to the field.

=== Relations with the Caliphs ===
Abu Bakr trusted Sa'd as one his personal guards, and Sa'd played a significant role during the first stage of the Ridda Wars, such as defending Medina and the pacification of Dumat al Jandal.

Sa'd was said to have a good relationship with Umar, who tended to micromanage his governors and generals. The caliph often took charge of Sa'd's general movements, as in the Battles of al-Qadisiyyah and Jalulua or the assignment of field commander compositions for many operations. However, Sa'd did not object to Umar's orders on when to engage in battle. Sa'd intensified his correspondences with Umar by creating an communication system between Medina and the frontline, giving the caliph a comprehensive understanding of the developments in Qadisiyyah. This trust continued until the later scandal during Sa'd's time as the governor of Kufa, where Umar said he still trusted Sa'd, but was forced him to replace him with another governor. The decision to remove Sa'd was not personal, but was necessary to prevent further scandals.

Sa'd was one of six people nominated by Umar ibn al-Khattab for the third caliphate, which resulted in the unanimous decision to elect Uthman, who carried out the will of Umar to reinstall Sa'd as governor by dismissing al-Mughira. Several years later, the relationship soured as Sa'd became involved in quarrels with Abdullah ibn Masud over Sa'd's inability to pay a debt to the latter. This quarrel caused Uthman to again remove Sa'd from the governorate of Kufa and appoint Al-Walid ibn Uqba as his replacement.

During the First Fitna, Sa'd and the majority of the surviving companions of Muhammad, including Ibn Maslama, remained neutral. Many resented this faction, as some thought their inactivity prevented a decisive result in the conflict. Modern analysts have theorized that this neutrality was based on Sa'd's belief that the search for Uthman's murderer should not drag the caliphate into civil war.

== Family tree ==
Sa'd ibn Abi Waqqas family tree, showing the relationship between the Banu Zuhrah and Banu Hashim
(Note: Bolded names are people with significant relationships to Sa'd ibn Abi Waqqas and Muhammad)

Quraysh
Fihr ibn Malik

Kilab ibn Murrah

Fatimah bint Sa'd

Zuhrah ibn Kilab
(progenitor of Banu Zuhrah)

Qusai ibn Kilab

Hubba bint Hulail

Abd al-Harith ibn Zuhra

Abd Manaf ibn Zuhrah

Abd Manaf ibn Qusai

Atikah bint Murrah

Abd al Awf ibn Abd al-Harith

Uhayb ibn Abd Manaf

Hashim ibn Abd Manaf
(progenitor of Banu Hashim)

Salma bint Amr

Wahb ibn Abd Manaf

Fatimah bint Amr

Abdul-Muttalib ibn Hashim

Halah bint Wuhayb

Malik ibn Uhayb

Hamnah bint Sufyan

Aminah bint Wahb

Abdullah ibn Abdul-Muttalib

Al-Harith ibn Abd al-Muttalib

Hamza ibn Abdul-Muttalib

Awf ibn Abd al-Awf

al-Shifaa bint Awf

Al-Zubayr ibn Abd al-Muttalib

Al-Abbas ibn Abd al-Muttalib

Abu Lahab ibn abd al-Muttalib

6 other sons
and 6 daughters

Abd al-Rahman ibn Awf az Zuhri

Sa'd ibn Abi al-Waqqas

Muhammad

Khadija bint Khuwaylid

Abu Talib ibn Abd al-Muttalib

Fatima bint Muhammad

Ali ibn Abi Talib

Abdullah ibn Abbas

Legend
descent
marriage

=== Descendants ===
Sa'd's descendants gained some degree of influence within the caliphate's political sphere, particularly within the late Rashidun and early Umayyad eras.

==== Early caliphate ====
According to Asad Q. Ahmed, Sa'd's clan was closely related to the southern Arabs, their main allies. Sa'd had children from two Kinda women. The first was Mawiyyah bint Qays, who bore him three daughters and two sons. The second was Umm Hilal bint Rabi', a daughter of a war camel breeder in Kufa; she bore Sa'd three children. Sa'd also married Makita bint Amr of the Banu Bahra' clan of the Quda'a tribe, which claimed descent from Ma'ad ibn Adnan. Makita bore four children. Another wife, Salma bint Khasafah, bore him six children. He had at least eight more wives from various tribes.

Sa'd's daughters with Mawiyyah married influential men of the caliphate, such as Al-Mughira ibn Shu'bah, Sa'd's lieutenant and a high-ranked sahaba hailing from the Banu Thaqif, and Ibrahim ibn Abd ar Rahman, the wealthy son of Abd al-Rahman ibn Awf, one of the ten to whom Paradise was promised. This tied the two prominent Zuhrite households together. Sa'd's grandson through Ibrahim was appointed the Shurta of Medina. Among the most notable of Sa'd and Mawiyyah's sons was Umar ibn Sa'ad, who enthusiastically made his own name in politics. Umar served Ubayd Allah ibn Ziyad during the Battle of Karbala and helped Ubayd Allah become the governor of Rayy and Hamadan. After the death of Yazid I, Umar gained even greater influence than Ubayd Allah as he secured strong support from the tribe of Kinda and was appointed governor of Iraq, despite being reviled by the citizens of Kufa due to his involvement in the death of Husayn ibn Ali. Sa'd's son Muhammad fought against the Umayyads during the Battle of al-Harra and in the rebellion of Ibn al-Ash'ath.

Sa'd's marriages to the women from Banu Bakr bin Wail and Taghlib bin Wail gave his descendants an alliance with those tribes. Sa'd's sons from these tribes, including the hadith narrator Kharija ibn Sa'd, were close to the Alids. Kharija married the daughter of Abd Allah ibn al-Zubayr, and their son was appointed as a sadaqah collector of the Zubayrids. Sa'd's son with Khawla al-Taghlib, Mus'ab ibn Sa'd, reportedly narrated traditions from Ali. He was engaged to the daughter of Hashim ibn Utba, Sa'd's nephew and an influential Alid personality. Mus'ab also married the daughter of Hasan ibn Farqad, one of Ali's supporters in the Battle of the Camel. This further strengthened the ties between Sa'd's children and the Alids.

Sa'd's children with his Quda'a wife, Makita bint Amir al-Bahra, were all married into the Zuhra clan.

Sa'd also married Salma of the Banu Talabah clan. She was the widow of deceased al-Muthanna ibn Haritha. Sa'd and Salma's children possessed ties to both the Umayyads and Alids. Their daughter Umm Ishaq married Hashim ibn Utba, and two of their other daughters, Umm Amr and Umm Ayyub, married Muhammad ibn Jubayr ibn Muṭʽim al-Abd Manaf, a strong Umayyad supporter. Their sons Umayr al-Asghar and Amr were killed during the Battle of al-Harra.

Asad Q. Ahmed states that Sa'd's children and grandchildren gained prominence during the early years of the Umayyad caliphate and were particularly popular with the southern Arab tribes due to his marriage alliances. Their prominence dwindled after the rise of Marwanids, who favored the Syrian-based northern Arabs at the expense of the southerners.

==== Caliphate of Cordoba ====
Ibrahim ibn Muhammad as-Sa'di al-Zuhri, better known as Ibn al-Iflili, was a 10th-century grammarian and linguist in the Caliphate of Córdoba. According to the 13th century Syrian writer Yaqut al-Hamawi, Ibrahim was descended from Sa'd's son Khalid. According to Ibn Bashkuwal, Muhammad II of Córdoba appointed Ibn al-Iflili as a minister during his reign.

== See also ==
- Emperor Gaozong of Tang
- Al-Mughira
- Rashidun cavalry
- Sunni view of the Sahaba
- The ten to whom Paradise was promised
- List of Sahabah
- Lost Mosque

== Notes ==
Preceded by -	Caliphate governor of Ctesiphon; 637–638	Succeeded by Office abolished
Preceded by -	Caliphate governor of Kufa; 638–642	Succeeded by Abdullah ibn Abdullah ibn Itban
Preceded by Al-Mughira ibn Shu'bah	Caliphate governor of Kufa; 645–646	Succeeded by Al-Walid ibn Uqba
