= Muhammad ibn Sa'd ibn Abi Waqqas =

Late 7th-century Arab soldier of Caliphate

- محمد بن سعد بن أبي وقاص
- Born: 640s Kufa, Rashidun Caliphate
- Died: 702
- Children: Isma'il ibn Muhammad
- Parents: Sa'd ibn Abi Waqqas (father); Mariya (mother)

Muhammad ibn Saʿd ibn Abī Waqqāṣ (Arabic: محمد بن سعد بن أبي وقاص) (fl. 683 – c. 702) was an Arab military commander and prominent opponent of the Umayyad Caliphate. A son of the companion Sa'd ibn Abi Waqqas, he participated in the Medinan resistance during the Battle of al-Harra (683) and later became a leading commander in the major Iraqi rebellion of Ibn al-Ash'ath against Umayyad rule. After the collapse of the revolt, he was captured by Umayyad authorities and executed on the orders of al-Hajjaj ibn Yusuf.

== Early life ==
Muhammad was a son of Sa'd ibn Abi Waqqas, one of the prominent companions of the Islamic prophet Muhammad and a member of his tribe, the Quraysh. Sa'd led the Muslim conquest of Iraq in the 630s and founded Kufa, one of the two main garrison centers and provincial capitals of Iraq. Muhammad was likely born in Iraq and moved to Medina, then capital of the Caliphate, after his father was dismissed from the governorship of Kufa in c. 645. Muhammad's mother, Mariya or Mawiya, belonged to the South Arabian Kinda tribe, which established an important presence in Kufa. He and his full brother, Umar ibn Sa'd, were the most politically active of Sa'd's many children.

== Opposition to the Umayyads ==
While his brother Umar fought for the Umayyad Caliphate, attaining infamy for killing the Islamic prophet's grandson Husayn ibn Ali at the Battle of Karbala in 680, Muhammad generally stood against the Umayyads. During the Battle of al-Harra in 683, when an Umayyad army was suppressing a rebellion in Medina, Muhammad fought in the ranks of the Medinans. He is reported by an account in the 9th-century history of al-Tabari to have pursued a troop of fleeing Umayyad troops, attacking them until retreating when the Umayyad field victory became clear. In another account, his attack against the Umayyad troops after they were ordered by their commander to halt fighting is implied to have provoked a renewed assault by the Umayyad army, which ended in the killings of more Medinan men, violations against women, and raiding of property in the town. He probably fled Medina soon afterward, but evidently returned during the governorship of al-Hajjaj ibn Yusuf in 692–694, as he is mentioned as part of a Medinan delegation to the Umayyad caliph Abd al-Malik petitioning for al-Hajjaj's dismissal.

== Role in the revolt of Ibn al-Ash'ath ==
Muhammad afterward moved back to Iraq where he became a supporter of the large-scale Iraqi rebellion led by the Kufan Kindite noble and commander Ibn al-Ash'ath. At the Battle of Dayr al-Jamajim in 701 he served as the commander of Ibn al-Ash'ath's infantry. They were defeated by the Syrian troops of the Umayyad Caliphate under al-Hajjaj, who had become Iraq's governor in 694. Muhammad then took control of the city of al-Mada'in (Ctesiphon) where many of the rebels later gathered, only to leave for Basra upon the approach of al-Hajjaj. Muhammad probably joined Ibn al-Ash'ath at the subsequent Battle of Maskin where they were again defeated, practically putting an end to the rebellion.

== Capture and execution ==
The historian Asad Ahmed assumes Muhammad fled with Ibn al-Ash'ath to Sijistan and then took refuge with the Zunbil. In any case, Muhammad split from Ibn al-Ash'ath and body of the rebels, and took up position in Khurasan, and gave his allegiance to Abd al-Rahman ibn Abbas al-Hashimi. He was captured by the governor of Khurasan, Yazid ibn al-Muhallab, who sent him to al-Hajjaj. The latter summoned him, declared him a malcontent and rebel, and then executed him.

== Descendants ==
Muhammad fathered a number of children by slave concubines. His descendants were not involved in political or military affairs, but a number became transmitters of historical or religious reports. His son Isma'il and grandson Abu Bakr ibn Isma'il are cited as sources by the 9th-century historian al-Tabari.

== Bibliography ==
- Ahmed, Asad Q. (2011). The Religious Elite of the Early Islamic Ḥijāz: Five Prosopographical Case Studies. Oxford: University of Oxford Linacre College Unit for Prosopographical Research. ISBN 978-1-900934-13-8.
- Brockett, Adrian, ed. (1997). The History of al-Ṭabarī, Volume XVI: The Community Divided: The Caliphate of ʿAlī I, A.D. 656–657/A.H. 35–36. SUNY Series in Near Eastern Studies. Albany, New York: State University of New York Press. ISBN 978-0-7914-2391-2.
