= Al-Mughira =

Companion of the Islamic prophet Muhammad

al-Mughira ibn Shu'ba al-Thaqafi
- المغيرة بن شعبة الثقفي

Rashidun governor of Kufa
- In office 642–645
- Preceded by: Ammar ibn Yasir
- Succeeded by: Sa'd ibn Abi Waqqas

Umayyad governor of Kufa
- In office 661–671
- Monarch: Mu'awiya I
- Succeeded by: Ziyad ibn Abihi

Personal details
- Born: c. 601 Ta'if
- Died: 671
- Relations: Urwa ibn Mas'ud (uncle)
- Children: 3
- Parent: Shu'ba ibn Abi Amir

Abu Abd Allah al-Mughira ibn Shu'ba ibn Abi Amir ibn Mas'ud al-Thaqafi (Arabic: المغيرة بن شعبة بن أبي عامر بن مسعود الثقفي, romanized: Abū ʿAbd Allāh al-Mughīra ibn Shuʿba ibn Abī ʿĀmir ibn Masʿūd al-Thaqafī); c. 600–671), was a prominent companion of the Islamic prophet Muhammad and was known as one of the four 'shrewds of the Arabs' (duhat al-Arab). He belonged to the tribe of Thaqif of Ta'if, who were part of the early Islamic elite. He served as governor of Kufa, one of the two principal Arab garrisons and administrative centers of Iraq, under Caliph Umar in 642–645. In his old age, al-Mughira was again made governor of Kufa, serving under the Umayyad caliph Mu'awiya I from 661 until his death in 671. During his second governorship, he ruled with virtual independence from the caliph.

== Ancestry and early life ==
Al-Mughira was the son of Shu'ba ibn Abi Amir and belonged to the Banu Mu'attib clan of the Banu Thaqif tribe of Ta'if. His clan were the traditional protectors of the shrine of al-Lat, one of many Arabian polytheistic deities worshiped in the pre-Islamic period. His uncle was Urwa ibn Mas'ud, a companion of the Islamic prophet Muhammad. Al-Mughira offered his services to the latter in Medina after being exiled from Ta'if for assaulting and robbing his associates in their sleep while they were travelling together. Muhammad and the nascent Muslim community had taken refuge in Medina as a result of their exile from Mecca. Muhammad with the help of al-Mughira persuaded the Thaqif to embrace Islam. He participated in the Muslims' attempted pilgrimage to Mecca, which was halted by the Quraysh at Hudaybiyya in April 628. Later, when Ta'if submitted to Muslim rule in 630, al-Mughira was tasked with overseeing the demolition of the al-Lat shrine.

== Service under the Rashidun caliphs ==
Following the death of Muhammad in 632, leadership of the emergent Muslim state passed to Abu Bakr, who retained al-Mughira in an administrative capacity. During this period, most high-ranking government posts were reserved for members of the Quraysh, the tribe of both Muhammad and the Caliph. Al-Mughira continued his military service and lost an eye during the Battle of the Yarmuk in August 636. Caliph Umar (r. 634–644) appointed him governor of Basra, , a newly founded garrison town that served as the primary springboard for the Muslim conquest of Persia. However, his tenure there was cut short when he was dismissed following allegations of adultery.

In 642, Umar reappointed al-Mughira as the governor of Kufa, the other major Arab garrison town in Iraq, where he succeeded Ammar ibn Yasir. Two years into this second governorship, a former slave of al-Mughira known as Abu Lu'lu'a assassinated Caliph Umar while he was praying in Medina. Umar's successor, Caliph Uthman (r. 644–656), kept al-Mughira as governor for another year until replacing him with Sa'd ibn Abi Waqqas. Al-Mughira retired from public life and returned to Ta'if upon the accession of Caliph Ali (r. 656–661) following Uthman's assassination in 656. From his hometown, he observed the chaotic events of the First Muslim Civil War between the supporters of Ali, who made Kufa his capital, and the bulk of the Quraysh, who opposed Ali's caliphate. When Ali and Mu'awiya ibn Abi Sufyan, the governor of Syria who had taken up the cause of avenging the death of his Umayyad kinsman Uthman, decided to settle the Battle of Siffin by arbitration in 657, al-Mughira, without invitation by either side, attended the talks at Udhruh.

== Death ==
Al-Mughira died of the plague sometime between 668 and 671 at the age of 70. According to the historians al-Waqidi (d. 823) and al-Mada'ini (d. 843), al-Mughira died in August or September 670. He was succeeded by Ziyad ibn Abih, whom he had groomed as his successor. Upon becoming the governor of Iraq in 694, al-Hajjaj ibn Yusuf appointed al-Mughira's sons al-Mutarrif, Urwa and Hamza his deputy governors in al-Mada'in, Kufa and Hamadhan, respectively, on account of their shared Thaqafi descent.

== See also ==
- List of Sahabah

== Bibliography ==
- Kennedy, Hugh (2004) [1986]. The Prophet and the Age of the Caliphates: The Islamic Near East from the 6th to the 11th Century (Second ed.). Harlow: Longman. ISBN 978-0-582-40525-7.
- Wellhausen, Julius (1927). The Arab Kingdom and Its Fall. Translated by Margaret Graham Weir. Calcutta: University of Calcutta.
- Madelung, Wilferd (1997). The Succession to Muhammad: A Study of the Early Caliphate. Cambridge University Press. ISBN 0-521-64696-0.
- Humphreys, R. Stephen, ed. (1990). The History of al-Ṭabarī, Volume XV: The Crisis of the Early Caliphate: The Reign of ʿUthmān, A.D. 644–656/A.H. 24–35. SUNY Series in Near Eastern Studies. Albany, New York: State University of New York Press. ISBN 978-0-7914-0154-5.
- Lammens, H. (1993). "al-Mughīra b. Shuʿba". In Bosworth, C. E.; van Donzel, E.; Heinrichs, W. P. & Pellat, Ch. (eds.). The Encyclopaedia of Islam, Second Edition. Volume VII: Mif–Naz. Leiden: E. J. Brill. p. 347. ISBN 978-90-04-09419-2.
- Landau-Tasseron, Ella, ed. (1998). The History of al-Ṭabarī, Volume XXXIX: Biographies of the Prophet's Companions and their Successors: al-Ṭabarī's Supplement to his History. SUNY Series in Near Eastern Studies. Albany, New York: State University of New York Press. ISBN 978-0-7914-2819-1.
- Morony, Michael G., ed. (1987). The History of al-Ṭabarī, Volume XVIII: Between Civil Wars: The Caliphate of Muʿāwiyah, 661–680 A.D./A.H. 40–60. SUNY Series in Near Eastern Studies. Albany, New York: State University of New York Press. ISBN 978-0-87395-933-9.
- Rowson, Everett K., ed. (1989). The History of al-Ṭabarī, Volume XXII: The Marwānid Restoration: The Caliphate of ʿAbd al-Malik, A.D. 693–701/A.H. 74–81. SUNY Series in Near Eastern Studies. Albany, New York: State University of New York Press. ISBN 978-0-88706-975-8.
