= Al-Arqam ibn Abi al-Arqam =

Arab companion of Muhammad (c.597–675)

Al-Arqam ibn Abī al-Arqam (Arabic: ألأرقم ابن أبي الأرقم) (c. 597-675) was an early companion of Prophet Muhammad. He was the owner of the house where the early Muslim community held its meetings.

== Biography ==
He was from the Makhzum clan of the Quraysh tribe. His father, known as Abu'l-Arqam, was Abdmanaf ibn Asad ibn Umar ibn Makhzum. His mother was Umayma bint Al-Harith from the Khuza'a tribe.

He married Hind bint Abdullah from the Asad tribe, and their children were Umayya and Maryam. By various concubines, he was also the father of Ubaydullah, Uthman and Safiya. The descendants of Ubaydullah died out; all of Al-Arqam's surviving descendants were through Uthman.

Al-Arqam is eighth on the list of "people who became Muslims at the invitation of Abu Bakr," who of course were not on the total list of all Muslims.

He joined the general emigration to Medina in 622, and Muhammad granted him a house there in the Zurayq quarter. He fought at Badr and, at the division of the spoils, asked for and obtained a sword named al-Marzuban. He also fought at the Uhud, the Battle of the Trench and "all the battles with Allah's Messenger."

He died during the reign of Mu’aawiyah in the year 675 (55 A.H.).

== The House of Al-Arqam ==
The harassment and persecution of Muslims by Quraysh polytheists (mushriks) in Mecca was increasing, and the Muslims could not worship comfortably. Al-Arqam's house was selected as a safe place to meet, pray and learn about the faith because it was located on the east of As-Safa Hill, where Muhammad was living at the commencement of his prophetic mission. The house could be entered and exited secretly because it was in a narrow street, and the street could be surveyed from within. In the fifth year of the mission Arqam’s house, which became known as the House of Islam, can be regarded as the first Islamic school, with Muhammad as the teacher and the first Muslims as its students.

New converts were brought to Al-Arqam's house. In the sixth year of the mission (615-616 CE), two powerful citizens of the Quraysh tribe, Muhammad’s uncle Hamza ibn Abdul Muttalib and Umar ibn Al-Khattab, entered to announce their adoption of Islam. Umar's conversion brought the total to forty men, after which the members of the group embarked on a mission to spread Islam to the world.

Al-Arqam bequeathed his house to his son on the condition that it would not be sold. However, in the time of Abu Jaafar al-Mansur, one of Al-Arqam's grandsons was persuaded to sell his share in the house for 17,000 dinars in exchange for being released from prison; and his relatives were then bribed into selling their own shares.

His house is now called Daru’l-Khayzuran after a subsequent owner. It is opposite the Kaaba and is used as a religious school today.
