= Muhammad ibn Abi Bakr al-Zuhri =

Geographer

- محمد بن أبي بكر الزهري
- Born: 12th century Granada, Al-Andalus
- Died: Between 1154 and 1161
- Occupation: Geographer
- Writing career
- Notable work: Kitāb al-Jughrāfiyya (Book of Geography)

Muḥammad ibn Abi Bakr al-Zuhri (Arabic: محمد بن أبي بكر الزهري) of Granada (fl. 1130s–1150s) was a geographer. He was the writer of a notable work, Kitāb al-Jughrāfiyya (Book of Geography). Al-Zuhri was able to use the writings of the geographers of the reign of caliph al-Ma'mun of Baghdad (d. 456/1068). He belonged to the Arab tribe of Banu Zuhrah. Al-Zuhri died between 1154 and 1161.
