= Aisha bint Sa'd ibn Abi Waqqas =

- عائشة بنت سعد
- Died: 735
- Occupation: Muhaddith
- Parent(s): Sa'd ibn Abi Waqqas

ʿĀʾisha bint Saʾd ibn Abi Waqqas al-Zuhriyya al-Madaniyya (c. 651-735) was a muhaddith.

ʿĀʾisha was born around 651 CE. She was the daughter of Sa'd ibn Abi Waqqas, an Islamic military commander and companion of Muhammad, and one of his wives named Zayn, a woman of the Banu Bakr bin Wa'il tribe taken as a prisoner of war.

Scholars differ on whether she should be classified as a companion or successor of the companions of Muhammad and on the reliability of her ḥadīth. She related ḥadīth from her father and from several of the wives of Muhammad.

A'isha ibn Sa`d ibn Abi Waqqas died on 735 at the age of 84.
