= Battle of Burs =

636 battle

- Part of the Muslim conquest of Sassanid Empire
Date	636 AD
Location	Burs 32.3934°N 44.3449°E
Result	Rashidun victory

Belligerents
Sassanid Empire	Rashidun Caliphate

Commanders and leaders
Busbuhra †	Zuhra bin al-Ḥawiyya

The Battle of Burs was a minor engagement in 636 AD at Burs or Birs Nimrud, now in central Iraq, during the Muslim conquest of the Sasanian Empire. The Rāshidūn commander, Zuhra ibn al-Ḥawiyya, defeated Busbuhra, the Sasanian commander of the town, in single combat, and the garrison offered little further resistance.

After his victory at the Battle of al-Qādisiyyah in summer 636, Saʿd ibn Abī Waqqās divided his army into five forces for the advance on Ctesiphon; they were commanded by Zuhra ibn al-Ḥawiyya, Abdullah ibn al-Mutʼim, Shurḥabīl ibn as-Simt, Khālid ibn Urfatah and Hāshim bin Utba. The force under Zuhra met with some resistance at Burs, but this was soon overcome after he defeated Busbuhra, the garrison commander, in single combat.
