= Amir ibn Abi Waqqas =

Companion of Muhammad (died c. 634)

ʿĀmir ibn Abī Waqqāṣ
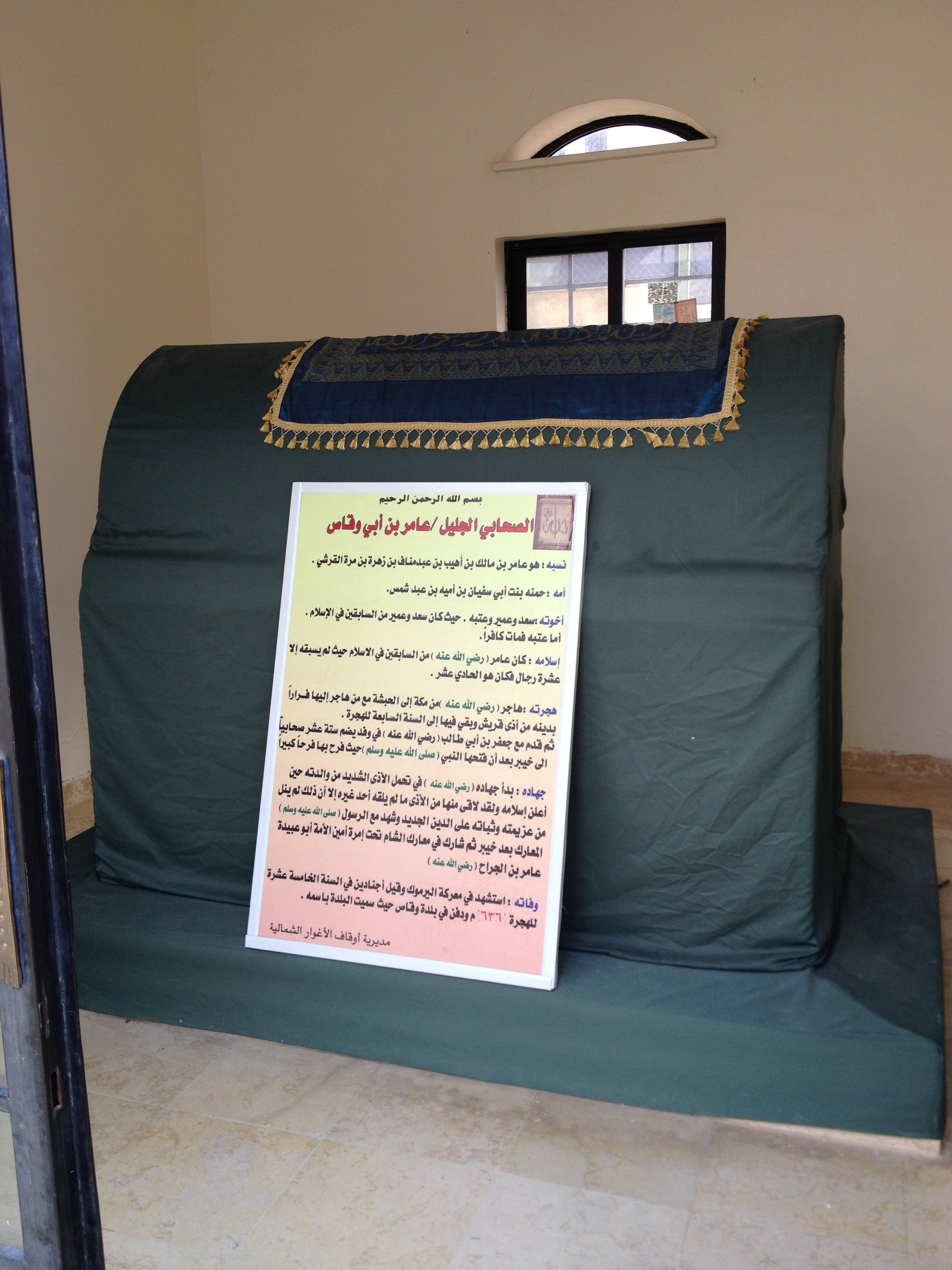
- A tomb dedicated to Amir in the Irbid Governorate.
- Born: Medina (present-day Saudi Arabia)
- Died: c. 634; Damascus, Syria
- Years active: 7th century CE
- Known for: Companion of Muhammad
- Relatives: Saʿd ibn Abī Waqqāṣ
- Family: Banu Zuhrah (from Quraysh)

ʿĀmir ibn Abī Waqqāṣ (Arabic: عامر بن أبي وقاص) was one of the companions of the Islamic prophet Muhammad. He was the brother of Sa'd ibn Abi Waqqas, a leading commander under the Rashidun Caliphate during their conquests of Persia. Like his brother, Amir participated in the Battle of Uhud and most early Islamic military campaigns, but did not live to see the reign of Uthman ibn Affan.

== Biography ==
He was born in the Banu Zuhrah clan of the Quraysh tribal confederation, being the second son to be born to Malik ibn Uhayb and Hamnah bint Sufyan. After his older brother Sa'd embraced Islam due to the increasing influence of Muhammad, Amir was also inclined on converting to Islam, but hesitated after his mother told him that she would not eat, drink or sleep if he did so. Eventually, Amir became a Muslim and joined the early Muslims in their mass migration to Abyssinia, and afterwards returned to Arabia, participating in the Battle of Uhud. Like most of the other Sahaba, Amir pledged his allegiance to Abu Bakr, the first Rashidun Caliph after the death of Muhammad. Along with his brother, he served as a messenger during the Islamic conquests of Persia.

Amir ibn Abi Waqqas kept a low profile during the caliphate of Abu Bakr, moving to Damascus, where he spent the rest of his life until his death during the caliphate of Umar (r. 634–644).

== Tomb ==
According to Ibn Hajar al-Asqalani, Amir died in Damascus, Syria. However, there is a tomb dedicated to Amir in the town of Waqqas in the Al-Āghwār ash-Shamāliyah district of Irbid Governorate, Jordan. The mausoleum dates back to the Mamluk period and was built between the 13th to 14th centuries. It was rebuilt in 2002 and incorporated into part of a larger Islamic religious complex which includes a mosque, library, and courtyard for communal gatherings. Its most recognizable aspects are the flat circular dome and Mamluk-style minaret.

== See also ==
- List of companions of Muhammad
