= Expedition of Hamza ibn Abd al-Muttalib =

623 historical campaign by Muhammad

Date	Ramadan 1 AH / 13 March 623 CE
Location	Al-‘Īṣ
Result	Intercession by a third party

Belligerents
Muhajirun of Medina	Quraysh of Mecca

Commanders and leaders
Hamza ibn Abd al-Muttalib	Amr ibn Hisham

Strength
30	300

Casualties and losses
None	None

Expedition of Hamza ibn Abd al-Muttalib (Arabic: سرية حمزة بن عبد المطلب), also known as Sīf Al-Baḥr platoon (Arabic: سرية سِيفُ البَحْرِ), was the first expedition sent out by the Islamic prophet Muhammad. It was sent in 1 AH of the Islamic calendar in the month of Ramadan (March 623 CE).

The raid, which was to intercept a caravan that belonged to Quraish, was undertaken by the Muhajirun (Muslim exiles in Medina) alone (none of the Ansar, Helpers of Madinah, participated in it).

== Description ==
The raid was ordered by Muhammad seven to nine months after the Hijrah. It was led by Hamza ibn 'Abdul-Muttalib (Muhammad's uncle) and comprising 30 men with a definite task of intercepting a caravan that belonged to Quraish. ‘Amr ibn Hishām (Abu Jahl), the leader of the caravan was camping at al-‘Is with 300 Meccan riders.

The two parties encountered each other, aligned and stood face to face in preparation for battle but Majdi ibn ‘Amr al-Juhani, a Quraysh who was friendly to both the parties intervened between them; so both parties separated without fighting. Hamza returned to Medina and Abu Jahl proceeded towards Mecca.

On that occasion, Muhammad accredited the first flag of Islam. Kinaz ibn Husain Al-Ghanawi was given the task of carrying it, and it was white in color.

== Location ==
The event took place on the seashore in the neighborhood of aI-‘Īṣ (العيص), in the territory of Banū Juhayna, between Mecca and Medina.

== See also ==
- Muhammad as a general
- List of expeditions of Muhammad
- Muslim–Quraysh War

Preceded by	Expeditions of Muhammad	Succeeded by Expedition of Ubaydah ibn al-Harith
