= Expedition of Ubaydah ibn al-Harith =

Expedition of Ubayda ibn al-Harith
- Part of the Muslim–Quraysh War
Date	April, 623 AD (1 AH)
Location	Batn Rabigh, Mecca, Hejaz
Result	Bloodless battle

Belligerents
Muhajirun of Medina	Quraysh of Mecca

Commanders and leaders
Ubayda ibn al-Harith	Abu Sufyan ibn Harb

Strength
60–80	200

Casualties and losses
Unknown (Arrows fired)	Unknown (1 arrow fired): 2 people defected to the Muslim side

In April 623, the Islamic prophet Muhammad sent Ubayda ibn al-Harith with a party of sixty armed Muhajirun (Muslim migrants to Medina) to the valley of Rabigh, in modern-day Saudi Arabia. They expected to intercept a Quraysh caravan that was returning from Syria under the protection of Abu Sufyan ibn Harb and 200 armed riders. The Muslim party travelled as far as the wells at Thanyat al-Murra, where Sa'd ibn Abi Waqqas shot an arrow at the Quraysh. This is known as the first arrow of Islam. Despite this surprise attack, "they did not unsheathe a sword or approach one another," and the Muslims returned empty-handed; however, two Meccans traders left their caravan, became Muslim, and went with the expedition back to Medina.

== Timing ==
Some say that Ubaydah ibn al-Harith was the first to whom Muhammad gave a banner on a military expedition; others say Hamza was the first.

Some scholars assert that Muhammad sent out the expedition while he was in Al-Abwa' or upon his return to the Medina from the raid of Al-Abwa'.

== See also ==
- Muhammad
- List of expeditions of Muhammad
- Military career of Muhammad
- Muslim–Quraysh War
- Sa'd ibn Abi Waqqas

Preceded by Expedition of Hamza ibn 'Abdul-Muttalib	Expeditions of Muhammad	Succeeded by Expedition of Sa'd ibn Abi Waqqas
