= Busbuhra =

Busbuhra was a local ruler of Aramean origin, who shifted alliance between the Rashidun Caliphate and the Sasanian Empire, to remain on his throne.

== Biography ==
An Aramean dehqan native to the Sasanian province of Asoristan, Busbuhra was the son of a certain Saluba ibn Nistuna, who, as a Sasanian subject, held the title of "lord" and owned land near al-Hira, the former capital of the Lakhmids, who were vassals of the Sasanians, but had been removed from power in 602. During the beginning of the Arab invasion of Iran, Busbuhra (or his father) made peace with the Arabs by agreeing to pay them and aid them against the Sasanians. Busbuhra is later mentioned regarding construction of a bridge which would allow the Arabs to move deeper into Sasanian territory.

However, the Arabs were eventually defeated at the battle of the Bridge. This made Busbuhra change his allegiance back to the Sasanians. He shortly confronted the Arabs at Burs, but was defeated and routed, while also wounded by a spear. He then fled to Bavel (Babylon) and regrouped with Sasanian troops and officers, who had survived another battle with the Arabs at al-Qadisiya. Busbuhra, however, died due to his wounds after the battle of Burs before he could confront the Arabs once more.

Busbuhra is known to have had two sons, Khalid and Jamil, who instead of serving their family overlords, the Sasanians, served the Arabs.

== Sources ==
- Morony, Michael G. (2005) [1984]. Iraq After The Muslim Conquest. Gorgias Press LLC. ISBN 978-1-59333-315-7.
- Al-Tabari, Abu Ja'far Muhammad ibn Jarir (1989). Yar-Shater, Ehsan (ed.). The History of al-Tabari Vol. 13: The Conquest of Iraq, Southwestern Persia, and Egypt: The Middle Years of 'Umar's Caliphate A.D. 636-642/A.H. 15-21. Trans. G. H. A. Juynboll. Albany, NY: State University of New York Press. ISBN 0887068766. Archived from the original on November 4, 2021.
