= Amsar =

Settlements established by Muslim warriors in conquered lands

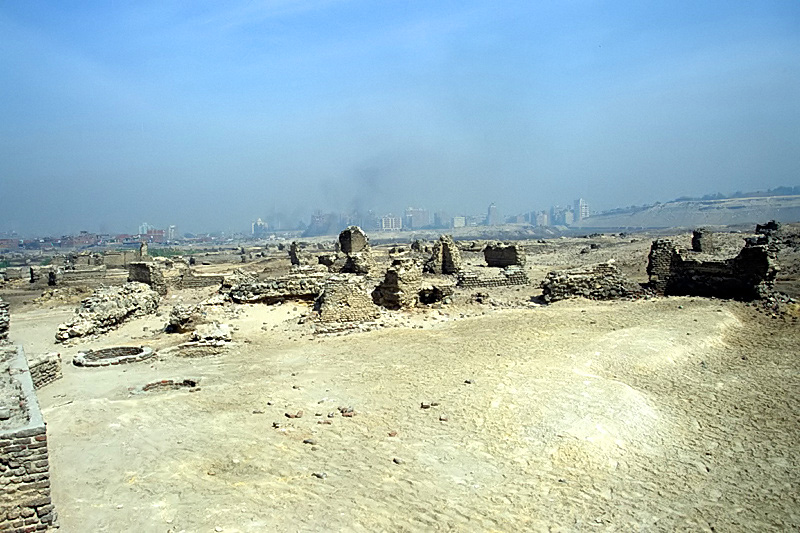
Ruins of Fustat in Old Cairo, Egypt

Amṣar (Arabic: أمصار), refer to civilised cities and large areas in which houses, markets, schools and other public facilities are located. The plural form also sometimes referred to 'garrison towns' or structures that were established by Muslim warriors in conquered lands, in the first centuries of Islam.

In the early years of Islamic expansion, the term misr was applied to new settlements founded by Muslim troops in conquered territories. The original Semitic meaning was "frontier" or "border", and took the meaning of "frontier outpost" when used by early Arab geographers. An administrative territorial unit led by an appointee of the caliph also became known as a misr. From the common noun for "garrison city", Misr became the name of Egypt's new Arab capital, and with time the entire country became known under this new Arabic name. The first misrs were created under Caliph Omar during his reign from AD 634 to 644. Many of these garrisons attracted civilians and became towns.

== Description ==
In the frontier area of the Arabic expansion, military forts (al-amsar, pl. Arabic: أمصار, amṣār), or ribat (Arabic: رباط ribāṭ, fortress) were founded. Militarily speaking, the structure and function of amṣār are similar to ancient Roman colonia. Like a frontier colony, the fortress served as a base for further conquests. Arabian military forts of the misr type were frequently built in the vicinity of existing older towns. They frequently were of square format.

Rather than maintaining their original purpose to serve as a military base, many amṣār developed into urban and administrative centers. In particular, this happened in the case of the Iraqi cities of Kufa and Basra, which became known as "al-miṣrān" ("the [two] forts"), but also with Fustat and Kairouan in North Africa.

== History ==
=== Rashidun era ===
Ibn al-Kalbi reported, Arfajah ibn Harthamah were the first who built Amsar, that accommodated the settlements of Muslim soldiers in the annexed territories permanently and also setting up the public facilities and mosques in the city. Due to instruction from caliph Umar, Arfaja Al-Bariqi set up a garrison (Amsar) in Mosul, and was appointed Wali (governor) there, particularly managing the revenue. The area of Mosul was very sparsely populated after conquered by the Muslims. After the area was settled and a mosque was erected, Umar ordered the resettlement of the 4000 settlers to Mosul. The new buildings were constructed from mud bricks, instead of reeds, a material that was popular in the region and other already populated areas were greatly expanded. At Mosul, Harthama, at the command of Umar, constructed a fort, few churches, a mosque and a locality for the Jewish population. He used it as his headquarters for the northern military operations. Utba consolidated his position in Tikrit and later advanced to Bajurmi and Shahrazour where his troops settled there. At Mosul Arfaja at the command of Umar, constructed a fort, few churches, a mosque and a locality for the Jewish population. After a short tenure of his governance, Arfajah instructed by caliph Umar to march with his 700 Azd soldiers to march towards the location which will be known in the future as Basra, while delegate the governance of Mosul to al Harith ibn Hassan. Arfajah and Utbah then founded the Amsar(garrison city) which named as Basra, where the military encampment in the location gradually supported with further permanent structures and growing into large settlement, The Amsar built by Arfajah has feature of seven tribal complexes which can fit the 700 garrison troops, and built houses of mud bricks, plaster and mud to replace the camps. As the buildings stands, Arfajah along with Hudhayfah ibn Muhsin and Mujazah ibn Thawr as-Sadusi, started to fill the complex with tribes of Azd, Tamim, and tribe of Sadus ibn Shayban. Arfajah then designed seven dams of adobe in Basra, two in the settlement of Al-Khuraybah, one in az-Zabuqah, two in Banu Tamim, and the last two in al-Azd tribe settlement

Another earliest Amsar built were Kufa which founded by Sa'd ibn Abi Waqqas, when he also instructed by caliph Umar to found new headquarters in Iraq for his army, so he moved towards a location that will known in the future as Kufa. here, he transported and dismantled walls and military structures from al-Mada'in to build new Amsar. the new Amsar were formally called Jund al-Kufah with features of seven divisions of complex that outfitted the Muslim soldiers who settled in that area permanently along with their family Sa'd made Kufa as his permanent headquarters.

== See also ==
- Ribat
- Caravanserai
