= Sasanian Empire =

Last pre-Islamic Iranian empire (224–651 AD)

Empire of the Iranians 𐭠𐭩𐭥𐭠𐭭𐭱𐭲𐭥𐭩 (Middle Persian) Ērānšahr
- 224–651
- Derafsh Kaviani (standard) Simurgh (emblem)

- The Sasanian Empire at its apex under Khosrow II
- Capital: Istakhr (224–226); Ctesiphon (226–637)
- Official languages: Middle Persian
- Religion: Zoroastrianism (official); Christianity; Manichaeism; Judaism; Mazdakism; Buddhism
- Government: Feudal monarchy
- King of Kings
  - 224–241: Ardashir I
  - 632–651: Yazdegerd III
- Historical era: Late antiquity
  - Battle of Hormozdgan: 28 April 224
  - Battle of Edessa: 260
  - Iberian War: 526–532
  - Byzantine–Sasanian War of 602–628: 602–628
  - Sasanian Interregnum: 628–632
  - Battle of al-Qadisiyyah: 16–19 November 636
  - Battle of Nahavand: 642
  - Fall to the Rashidun Caliphate: 651

Area
- 550: 3,500,000 km^{2} (1,400,000 sq mi)
Preceded by
Parthian Empire
Kingdom of Iberia
Kushan Empire
Kingdom of Armenia
Kings of Persis
Elymais
Succeeded by
Rashidun Caliphate
Dabuyid dynasty
Bavand dynasty
Zarmihrids
Masmughans of Damavand
Qarinvand dynasty
Tokhara Yabghus

The Sasanian Empire (/sə.ˈsɑː.ni.ən/), officially Eranshahr (Middle Persian: 𐭠𐭩𐭥𐭠𐭭𐭱𐭲𐭥𐭩, romanized: Ērānšahr, lit. 'Empire of the Iranians'), (Note: Book Pahlavi spelling: (ʾylʾnštr'); Inscriptional Pahlavi spelling: 𐭠𐭩𐭥𐭠𐭭𐭱𐭲𐭥𐭩 (ʾyrʾnštry), 𐭠𐭩𐭫𐭠𐭭𐭱𐭲𐭥𐭩 (ʾylʾnštry); Modern Persian: ایران‌شهر whence the New Persian terms Iranshahr and Iran) was an Iranian empire that was founded and ruled by the House of Sasan from 224 to 651 AD (the era of late antiquity). Lasting for over four centuries, the length of the Sasanian dynasty's reign over ancient Iran was second only to that of the Arsacid dynasty of Parthia which immediately preceded it.

Founded by Ardashir I, whose rise coincided with the decline of Arsacid influence in the face of both internal and external strife, the House of Sasan was highly determined to restore the legacy of the Achaemenid Empire by expanding and consolidating the dominions of the Iranian nation. Most notably, after defeating Artabanus IV of Parthia at the Battle of Hormozdgan in 224, it began competing far more zealously with the neighboring Roman Empire than the Arsacids had, thus sparking a new phase of the Roman–Iranian Wars. These efforts by Sasanian rulers ultimately led to the re-establishment of Iran as a major power of late antiquity.

At its zenith, the Sasanian Empire controlled all of modern-day Iran and Iraq and parts of the Arabian Peninsula, in particular Eastern Arabia and South Arabia, the Caucasus, the Levant, parts of Central Asia as well as parts of the Indian subcontinent. They maintained Ctesiphon as the capital city—as it had been under the Arsacids—for all but the first two years of their empire's existence, when Istakhr briefly served in this capacity.

A high point in the history of Iranian civilization, the Sasanian Empire was characterized by a complex and centralized government bureaucracy and the revitalization of Zoroastrianism as a legitimizing and unifying ideal. This period saw the construction of many grand monuments, public works, and patronized cultural and educational institutions. Under the Sasanians, Iran's cultural influence spread far beyond the territory that it controlled, influencing regions as distant as Western Europe, (Note: "Repaying its debt, Sasanian art exported its forms and motives eastward into India, Turkestan, and China, as well as westward into Syria, Asia Minor, Constantinople, the Balkans, Egypt, and Spain.") East Africa, China and India. It also helped shape European and Asian medieval art.

Following the rise of Islam in Arabia, and a devastating war with the Byzantine/Eastern Roman Empire, the Sasanian Empire fell to the early Muslim conquests, which were initiated by Muhammad and continued under the Rashidun Caliphate. Although the Muslim conquest of Iran marked a significant religious and cultural shift in the nation's history, the Islamization of Iran enabled the gradual absorption of Sasanian art, architecture, music, literature, and philosophy into nascent Islamic culture, which, in turn, ensured and sustained the proliferation and evolution of Iranian culture, knowledge, and ideas throughout the growing Muslim world.

== Name ==
Officially, the Sasanian Empire was known as the "Empire (Note: Also translated as realm (Note: "This relief demonstrates that Ardashir believed or wanted others to believe that he was appointed by God to rule over a territory which the inscriptions call Iranshahr (realm of the Iranians/Aryans) and the people") or kingdom.) of the Iranians" (Middle Persian: 𐭠𐭩𐭥𐭠𐭭𐭱𐭲𐭥𐭩 Ērānšahr; Parthian: 𐭀𐭓𐭉𐭀𐭍𐭇𐭔𐭕𐭓 Aryānxšahr; Greek: Ἀριανῶν ἔθνος Arianōn Ethnos). The term is first attested in the trilingual Great Inscription of Shapur I, in which the king declares "I am the lord of the Empire of the Iranians." (Note: Middle Persian: an... ērānšahr xwadāy hēm, Parthian: az... aryānšahr xwadāy ahēm, Greek: egō... tou Arianōn ethnous despotēs eimi)

More commonly, the empire, like the Sasanian dynasty itself, is named directly after Sasan in historical and academic sources. This term is variously recorded in English as the Sassanian Empire, the Sasanid Empire, and the Sassanid Empire.

== History ==
=== Origins and early history (205–310) ===
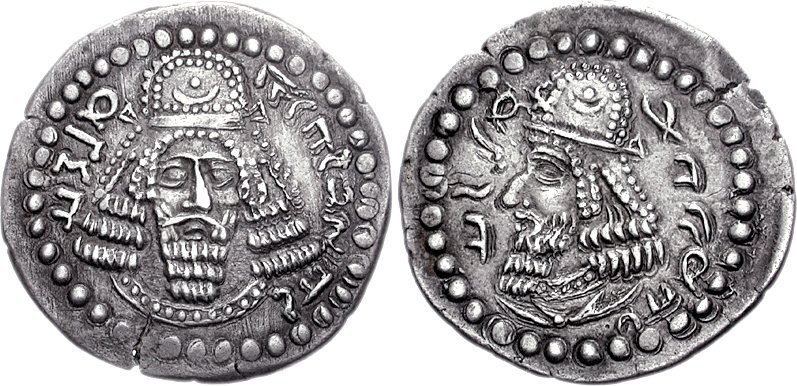
Initial coinage of founder Ardashir I, as King of Persis Artaxerxes (Ardaxsir) V. c. 205/6–223/4 AD. Obverse: Bearded facing head, wearing diadem and Parthian-style tiara, legend "The divine Ardaxir, king" in Pahlavi. Reverse: Bearded head of Papak, wearing diadem and Parthian-style tiara, legend "son of the divinity Papak, king" in Pahlavi.

Conflicting accounts shroud the details of the fall of the Parthian Empire and subsequent rise of the Sasanian Empire in mystery. The Sasanian Empire was established in Estakhr by Ardashir I.

Ardashir's father, Papak, was originally the ruler of a region called Khir. However, by 200, Papak had managed to overthrow Gochihr and appoint himself the new ruler of the Bazrangids. Papak's mother, Rodhagh, was the daughter of the provincial governor of Pars. Papak and his eldest son Shapur managed to expand their power over all of Pars. Subsequent events are unclear due to the elusive nature of the sources. It is certain that following the death of Papak, Ardashir, the governor of Darabgerd, became involved in a power struggle with his elder brother Shapur. Sources reveal that Shapur was killed when the roof of a building collapsed on him. By 208, over the protests of his other brothers, who were put to death, Ardashir declared himself ruler of Pars.

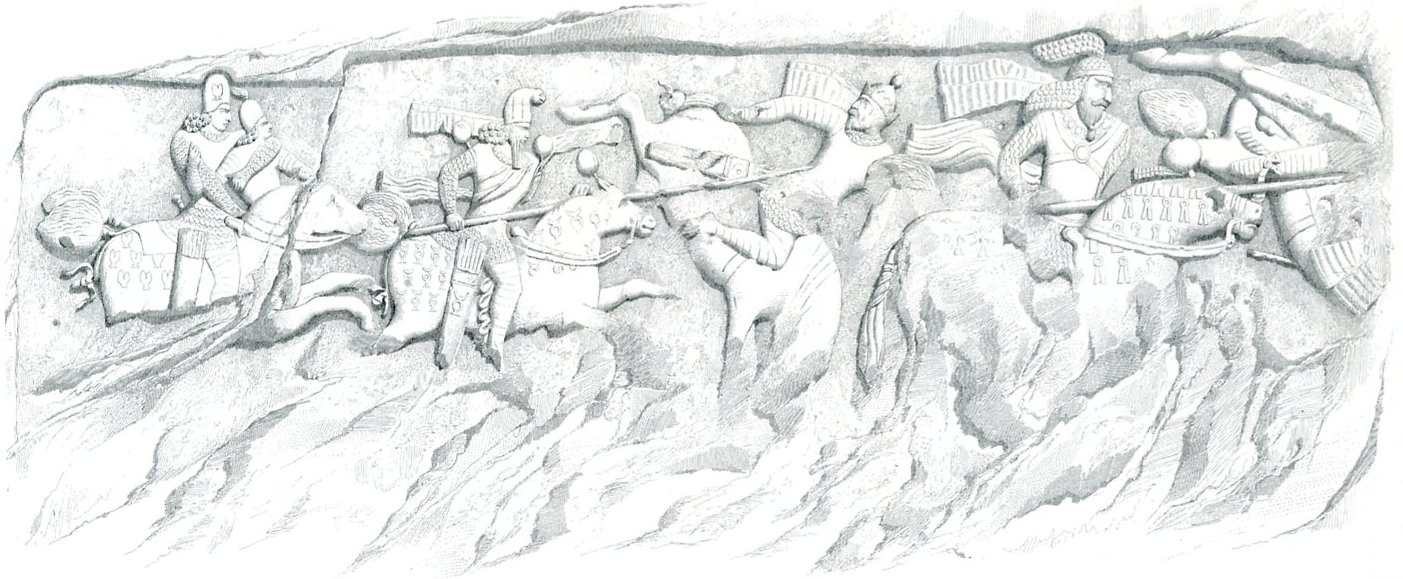
1840 illustration of a Sasanian relief at Firuzabad, showing Ardashir I's victory over Artabanus IV and his forces.

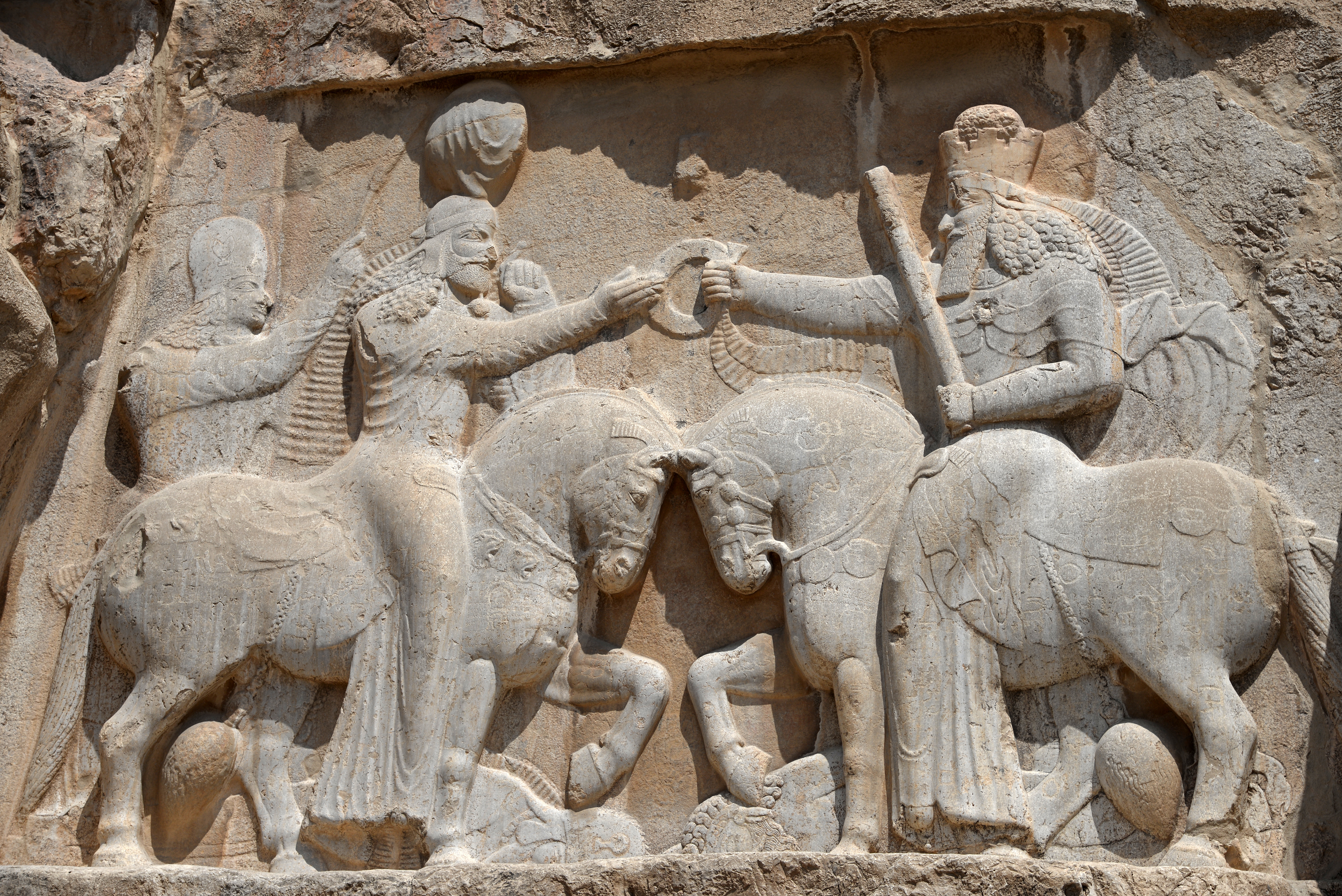
Rock relief of Ardashir I receiving the ring of kingship by the Zoroastrian supreme god Ahura Mazda

Once Ardashir was appointed shah (king), he moved his capital further to the south of Pars and founded Ardashir-Khwarrah (formerly Gur, modern day Firuzabad). The city, well protected by high mountains and easily defensible due to the narrow passes that approached it, became the center of Ardashir's efforts to gain more power. It was surrounded by a high, circular wall, probably copied from that of Darabgerd. Ardashir's palace was on the north side of the city; remains of it are extant. After establishing his rule over Pars, Ardashir rapidly extended his territory, demanding fealty from the local princes of Pars, and gaining control over the neighboring provinces of Kerman, Isfahan, Susiana and Mesene. This expansion quickly came to the attention of Artabanus IV, the Parthian king, who initially ordered the governor of Khuzestan to wage war against Ardashir in 224, but Ardashir was victorious in the ensuing battles. In a second attempt to destroy Ardashir, Artabanus himself met Ardashir in battle at Hormozgan, where the former met his death. Following the death of the Parthian ruler, Ardashir went on to invade the western provinces of the now defunct Parthian Empire.

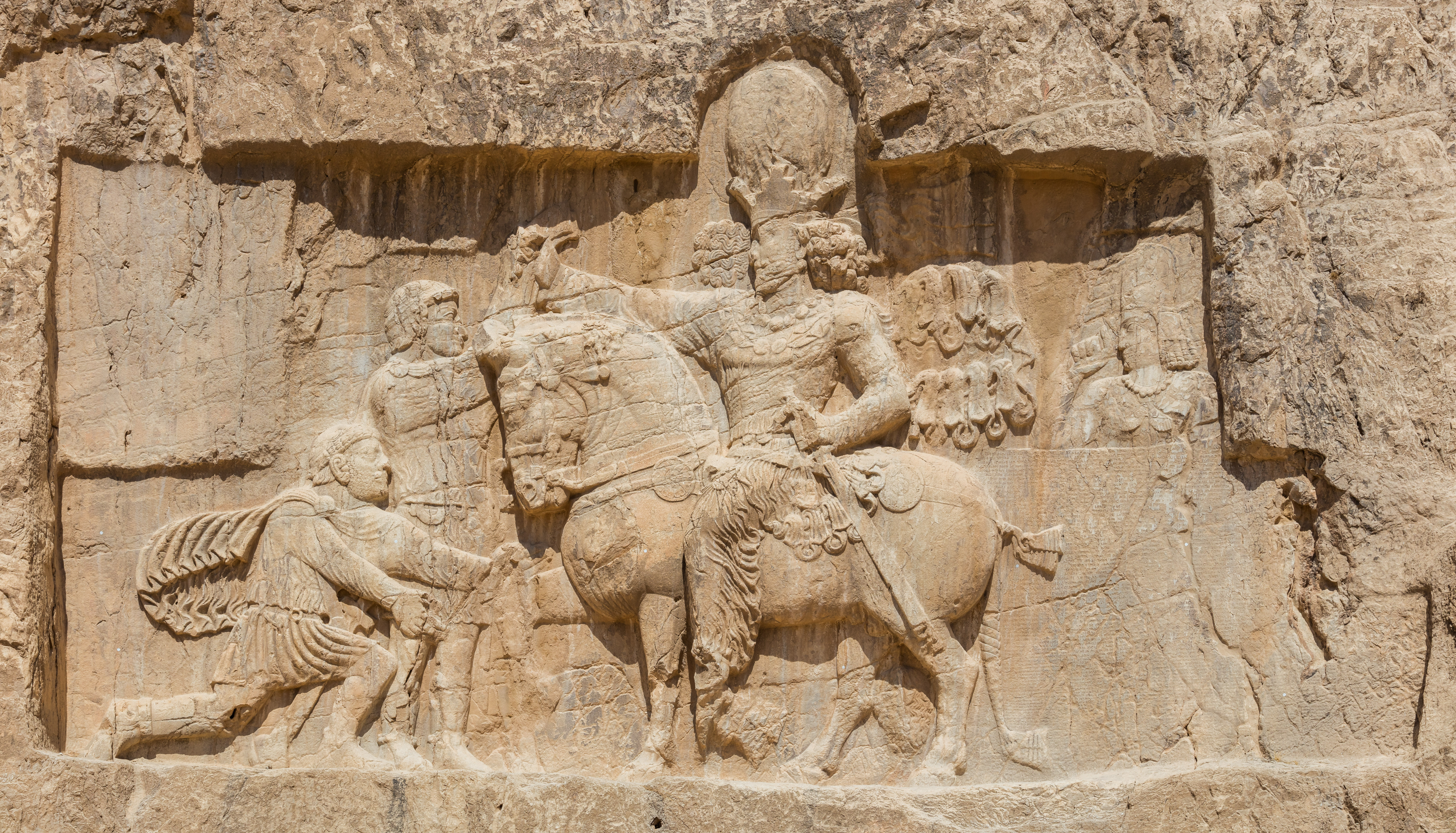
Rock-face relief at Naqsh-e Rostam of Persian emperor Shapur I (on horseback) capturing Roman emperor Valerian (standing) and Philip the Arab (kneeling), suing for peace, following the victory at Edessa.

At that time the Arsacid dynasty was divided between supporters of Artabanus IV and Vologases VI, which probably allowed Ardashir to consolidate his authority in the south with little or no interference from the Parthians. Ardashir was aided by the geography of the province of Pars, which was separated from the rest of Iran. Crowned in 224 at Ctesiphon as the sole ruler of Persia, Ardashir took the title shahanshah, or "King of Kings" (the inscriptions mention Adhur-Anahid as his banbishnan banbishn, "Queen of Queens", but her relationship with Ardashir has not been fully established), bringing the 400-year-old Parthian Empire to an end, and beginning four centuries of Sassanid rule.

In the next few years, local rebellions occurred throughout the empire. Nonetheless, Ardashir I further expanded his new empire to the east and northwest, conquering the provinces of Sakastan, Gorgan, Khorasan, Marw (in modern Turkmenistan), Balkh and Chorasmia. He also added Bahrain and Mosul to the Sassanid possessions. Later Sassanid inscriptions also claim the submission of the kings of Kushan, Turan and Makuran to Ardashir, although based on numismatic evidence it is more likely that these actually submitted to Ardashir's son, the future Shapur I. In the west, assaults against Hatra, Armenia and Adiabene met with less success. In 230, Ardashir raided deep into Roman territory, and a Roman counter-offensive two years later ended inconclusively. Ardashīr began leading campaigns into Greater Khurasan as early as 233, extending his power to Khwarazm in the north and Sistan in the south while capturing lands from Gorgan to Abarshahr, Marw, and as far east as Balkh.

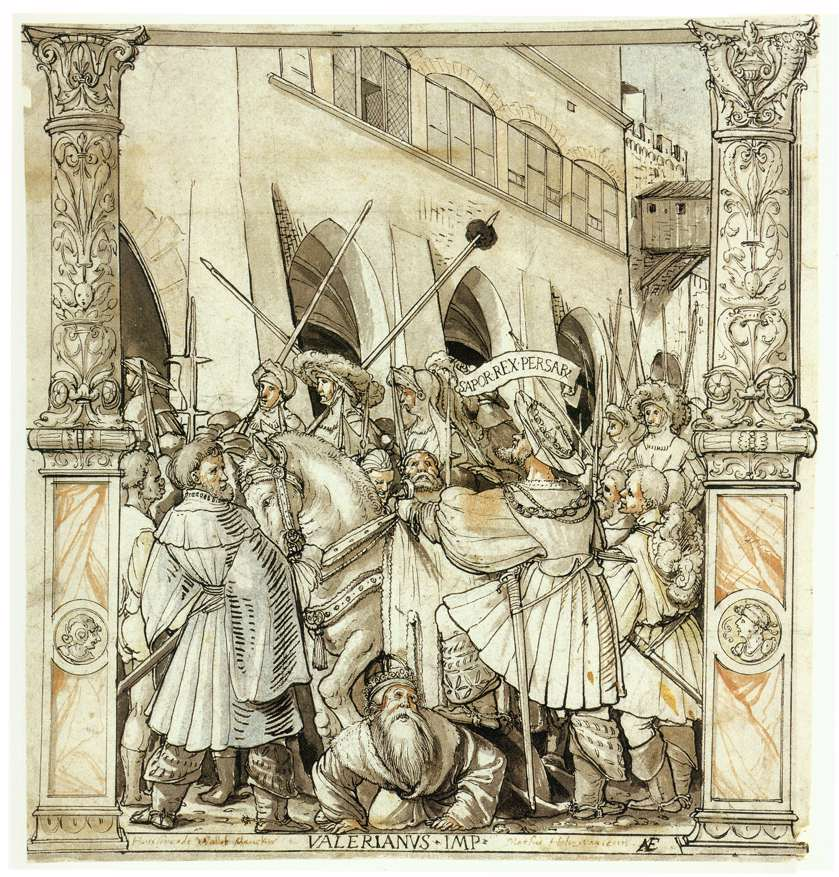
The Humiliation of Valerian by Shapur (Hans Holbein the Younger, 1521, pen and black ink on a chalk sketch, Kunstmuseum Basel)

Ardashir I's son Shapur I continued the expansion of the empire, conquering Bactria and the western portion of the Kushan Empire, while leading several campaigns against Rome. Invading Roman Mesopotamia, Shapur I captured Carrhae and Nisibis, but in 243 the Roman general Timesitheus defeated the Persians at Rhesaina and regained the lost territories. The emperor Gordian III's (238–244) subsequent advance down the Euphrates was defeated at Meshike (244), leading to Gordian's murder by his own troops and enabling Shapur to conclude a highly advantageous peace treaty with the new emperor Philip the Arab, by which he secured the immediate payment of 500,000 denarii and further annual payments.

Shapur soon resumed the war, defeated the Romans at Barbalissos (253), and then probably took and plundered Antioch. Roman counter-attacks under the emperor Valerian ended in disaster when the Roman army was defeated and besieged at Edessa and Valerian was captured by Shapur, remaining his prisoner for the rest of his life. Shapur celebrated his victory by carving the impressive rock reliefs in Naqsh-e Rostam and Bishapur, as well as a monumental inscription in Persian and Greek in the vicinity of Persepolis. He exploited his success by advancing into Anatolia (260), but withdrew in disarray after defeats at the hands of the Romans and their Palmyrene ally Odaenathus, suffering the capture of his harem and the loss of all the Roman territories he had occupied. In 262 AD, Shapur attacked the Kushans destroying the cities of Begram and Taxila.

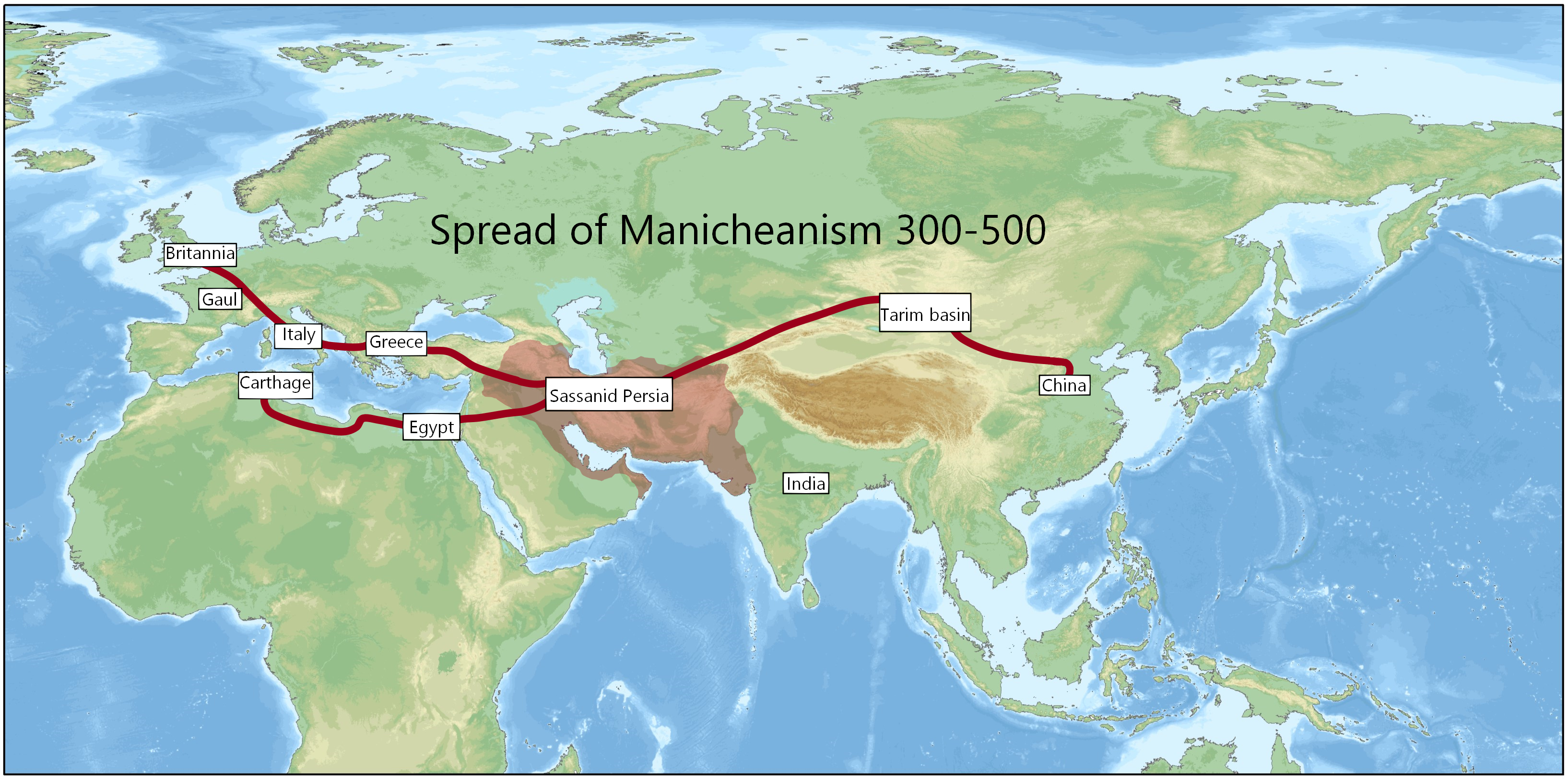
The spread of Manichaeism (300–500)

Shapur ordered the construction of the first dam bridge in Iran and founded many cities. Two cities, Bishapur and Nishapur, are named after him. He particularly favoured Manichaeism, protecting Mani (who dedicated one of his books, the Shabuhragan, to him) and sent many Manichaean missionaries abroad. He also befriended a Babylonian rabbi called Samuel.

This friendship was advantageous for the Jewish community and gave them a respite from the oppressive laws enacted against them. Later kings reversed Shapur's policy of religious tolerance. When Shapur's son Bahram I acceded to the throne, he was pressured by the Zoroastrian high-priest Kartir Bahram I to kill Mani and persecute his followers. Bahram II was also amenable to the wishes of the Zoroastrian priesthood. During his reign, the Sasanian capital Ctesiphon was sacked by the Romans under Emperor Carus, and most of Armenia, after half a century of Persian rule, was ceded to Diocletian.

Succeeding Bahram III (who ruled briefly in 293), Narseh embarked on another war with the Romans. After an early success against the Emperor Galerius near Callinicum on the Euphrates in 296, he was eventually decisively defeated by them. Galerius had been reinforced, probably in the spring of 298, by a new contingent collected from the empire's Danubian holdings. Narseh did not advance from Armenia and Mesopotamia, leaving Galerius to lead the offensive in 298 with an attack on northern Mesopotamia via Armenia. Narseh retreated to Armenia to fight Galerius's force, to the former's disadvantage: the rugged Armenian terrain was favourable to Roman infantry, but not to Sassanid cavalry. Local aid gave Galerius the advantage of surprise over the Persian forces, and, in two successive battles, Galerius secured victories over Narseh.

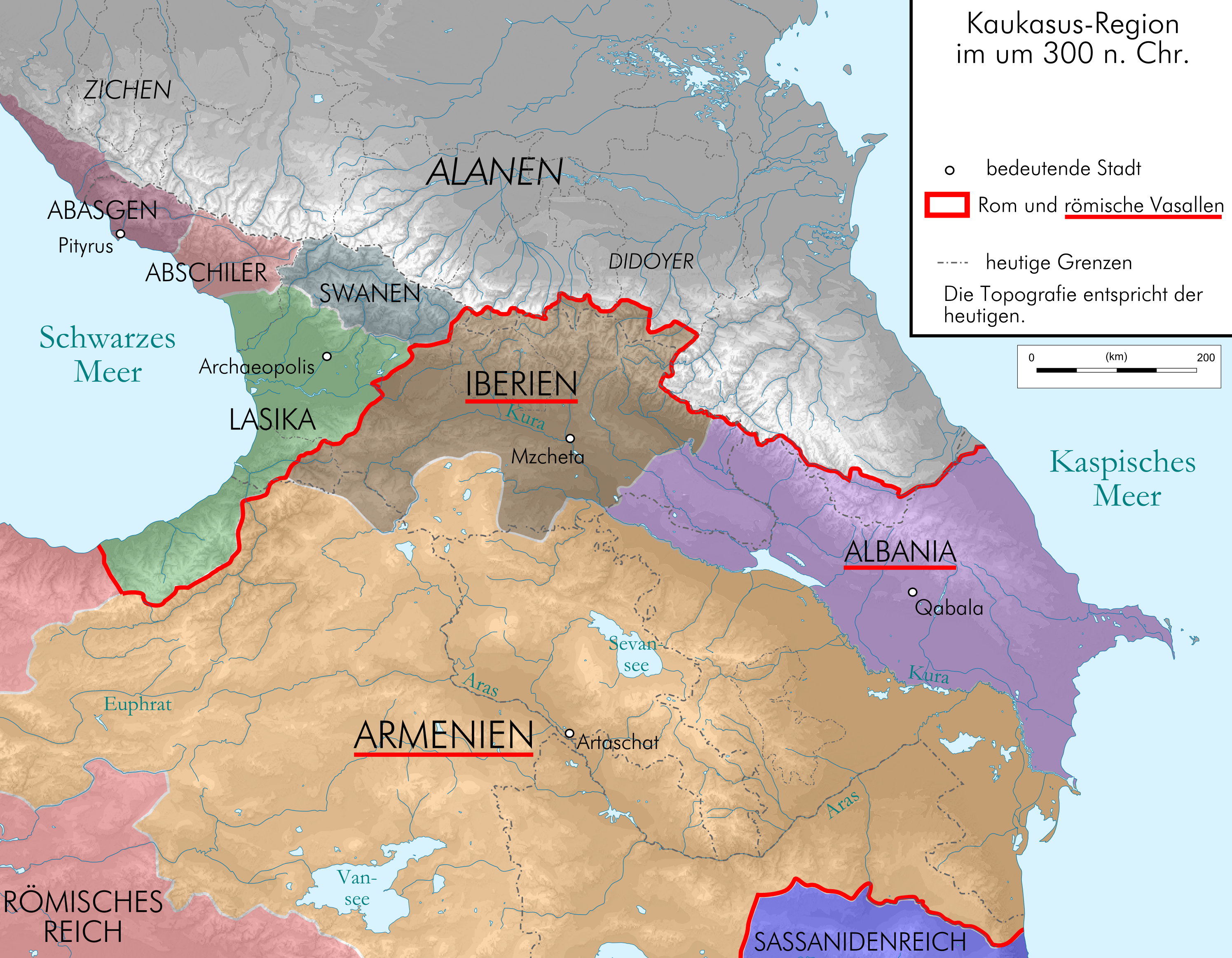
Rome and satellite kingdom of Armenia around 300, after Narseh's defeat

During the second encounter, Roman forces seized Narseh's camp, his treasury, his harem, and his wife. Galerius advanced into Media and Adiabene, winning successive victories, most prominently near Erzurum, and securing Nisibis (Nusaybin, Turkey) before 1 October 298. He then advanced down the Tigris, taking Ctesiphon. Narseh had previously sent an ambassador to Galerius to plead for the return of his wives and children. Peace negotiations began in the spring of 299, with both Diocletian and Galerius presiding.

The conditions of the peace were heavy: Persia would give up territory to Rome, making the Tigris the boundary between the two empires. Further terms specified that Armenia was returned to Roman domination, with the fort of Ziatha as its border; Caucasian Iberia would pay allegiance to Rome under a Roman appointee; Nisibis, now under Roman rule, would become the sole conduit for trade between Persia and Rome; and Rome would exercise control over the five satrapies between the Tigris and Armenia: Ingilene, Sophanene (Sophene), Arzanene (Aghdznik), Corduene, and Zabdicene (near modern Hakkâri, Turkey).

The Sasanians ceded five provinces west of the Tigris, and agreed not to interfere in the affairs of Armenia and Georgia. In the aftermath of this defeat, Narseh gave up the throne and died a year later, leaving the Sasanian throne to his son, Hormizd II. Unrest spread throughout the land, and while the new king suppressed revolts in Sakastan and Kushan, he was unable to control the nobles and was subsequently killed by Bedouins on a hunting trip in 309.

=== First Golden Era (309–379) ===
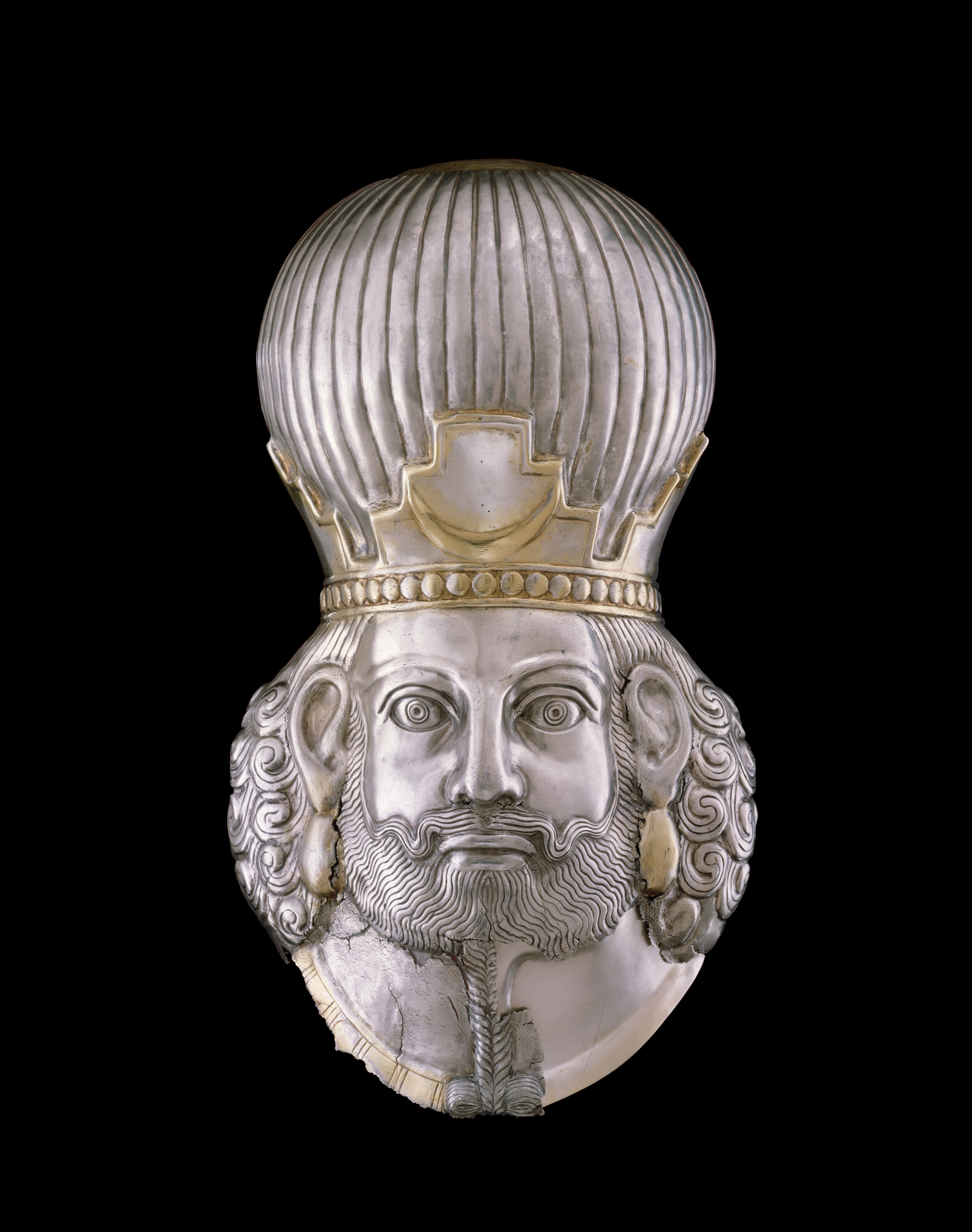
Bust of Shapur II (r. 309–379), Met Museum

Following Hormizd II's death, northern Arabs started to ravage and plunder the western cities of the empire, even attacking the province of pars, the birthplace of the Sasanian kings. Meanwhile, Persian nobles killed Hormizd II's eldest son, blinded the second, and imprisoned the third (who later escaped into Roman territory). The throne was reserved for a younger son, Shapur II. (Note: Alireza Shapour Shahbazi, citing Otto Seeck (1920), writes that the account of Shapur being elected as ruler while still in his mother's womb is "unfounded". This account is recorded in the Greek author Agathias's Histories.) During his youth the empire was controlled by his mother and the nobles. Upon coming of age, Shapur II assumed power and quickly proved to be an active and effective ruler.

He first led his small but disciplined army south against the Arabs, whom he defeated, securing the southern areas of the empire. He then began his first campaign against the Romans in the west, where Persian forces won a series of battles but were unable to make territorial gains due to the failure of repeated sieges of the key frontier city of Nisibis, and Roman success in retaking the cities of Singara and Amida after they had previously fallen to the Persians.

These campaigns were halted by nomadic raids along the eastern borders of the empire, which threatened Transoxiana, a strategically critical area for control of the Silk Road. Shapur therefore marched east toward Transoxiana to meet the eastern nomads, leaving his local commanders to mount nuisance raids on the Romans. He crushed the Central Asian tribes, and annexed the area as a new province.

In the east around 325, Shapur II regained the upper hand against the Kushano-Sasanian Kingdom and took control of large territories in areas now known as Afghanistan and Pakistan. Cultural expansion followed this victory, and Sasanian art penetrated Transoxiana, reaching as far as China. Shapur, along with the nomad King Grumbates, started his second campaign against the Romans in 359 and soon succeeded in retaking Singara and Amida. In response the Roman emperor Julian struck deep into Persian territory and defeated Shapur's forces at Ctesiphon. He failed to take the capital, however, and was killed while trying to retreat to Roman territory. His successor Jovian, trapped on the east bank of the Tigris, had to hand over all the provinces the Persians had ceded to Rome in 298, as well as Nisibis and Singara, to secure safe passage for his army out of Persia. Hostilities with the Roman Empire soon resumed in the Armeno-Sasanian War of 363–371, when Shapur II attempted to consolidate control over Armenia, which led to the subsequent intervention of Emperor Valens and the victory of joint Roman-Armenian forces at Bagavan in 371. According to contemporary historians, the Sassanids had to cede much of the southern Caucasus and northern Mesopotamia to the Romans and their Armenian allies, largely neutralizing the gains made by Shapur II in 363. Afterwards, a seven-year truce was negotiated, which ensured relative peace on the border until 378/379, shortly before Shapur II's death.

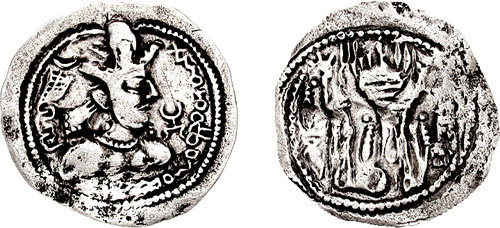
Early Alchon Huns coin based on the coin design of Shapur II, adding the Alchon Tamgha symbol and Alchono (αλχοννο) in Bactrian script on the obverse. Dated 400–440.

From around 370, towards the end of the reign of Shapur II, the Sasanians lost the control of Bactria to invaders from the north: first the Kidarites, then the Hephthalites and finally the Alchon Huns, who would follow up with an invasion of India. These invaders initially issued coins based on Sasanian designs. Various coins minted in Bactria and based on Sasanian designs are extant, often with busts imitating Sassanian kings Shapur II (r. 309 to 379) and Shapur III (r. 383 to 388), adding the Alchon Tamgha and the name "Alchono" in Bactrian script on the obverse, and with attendants to a fire altar on the reverse.

Shapur II pursued a harsh religious policy. Under his reign, the collection of the Avesta, the sacred texts of Zoroastrianism, was completed, heresy and apostasy were punished, and Christians were persecuted. The latter was a reaction against the Christianization of the Roman Empire by Constantine the Great. Shapur II, like Shapur I, was amicable towards Jews, who lived in relative freedom and gained many advantages during his reign. (Note: See also: Raba)

=== Intermediate Era (379–498) ===
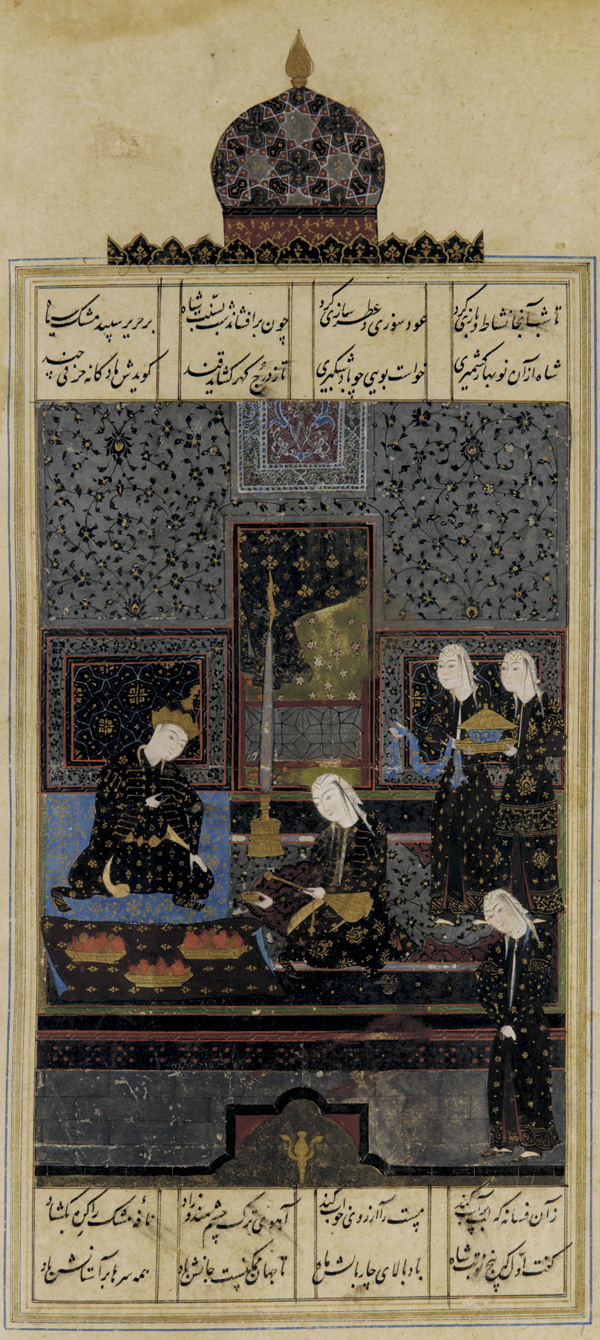
Bahram V is a great favourite in Persian literature and poetry. This illustration (mid-16th-century, Safavid era) to the Persian poet Nizami's epic poem Haft Peykar depicts Bahram and an Indian princess.

From Shapur II's death until Kavad I's first coronation, there was a largely peaceful period with the Romans (by this time the Eastern Roman or Byzantine Empire) engaged in just two brief wars with the Sasanian Empire, the first in 421–422 and the second in 440. Throughout this era, Sasanian religious policy differed dramatically from king to king. Despite a series of weak leaders, the administrative system established during Shapur II's reign remained strong, and the empire continued to function effectively.

After Shapur II died in 379, the empire passed on to his half-brother Ardashir II (379–383; son of Hormizd II) and his son Shapur III (383–388), neither of whom demonstrated their predecessor's skill in ruling. Bahram IV (388–399) also failed to achieve anything important for the empire. During this time Armenia was divided by a treaty between the Roman and Sasanian empires. The Sasanians reestablished their rule over Greater Armenia, while the Byzantine Empire held a small portion of western Armenia.

Bahram IV's son Yazdegerd I (399–421) is often compared to Constantine I. Both were physically and diplomatically powerful, opportunistic, practiced religious tolerance and provided freedom for the rise of religious minorities. Yazdegerd stopped the persecution against the Christians and punished nobles and priests who persecuted them. His reign marked a relatively peaceful era with the Romans, and he even took the young Theodosius II (408–450) under his guardianship. Yazdegerd also married a Jewish princess, who bore him a son called Narsi.

Yazdegerd I's successor was his son Bahram V (421–438), one of the most well-known Sasanian kings and the hero of many myths. These myths persisted even after the destruction of the Sasanian Empire by the Arabs. Bahram gained the crown after Yazdegerd's sudden death (or assassination), which occurred when the grandees opposed the king with the help of al-Mundhir, the Arabic dynast of al-Hirah. Bahram's mother was Shushandukht, the daughter of the Jewish Exilarch. In 427, he crushed an invasion in the east by the nomadic Hephthalites, extending his influence into Central Asia, where his portrait survived for centuries on the coinage of Bukhara (in modern Uzbekistan). Bahram deposed the vassal king of the Iranian-held area of Armenia and made it a province of the empire.

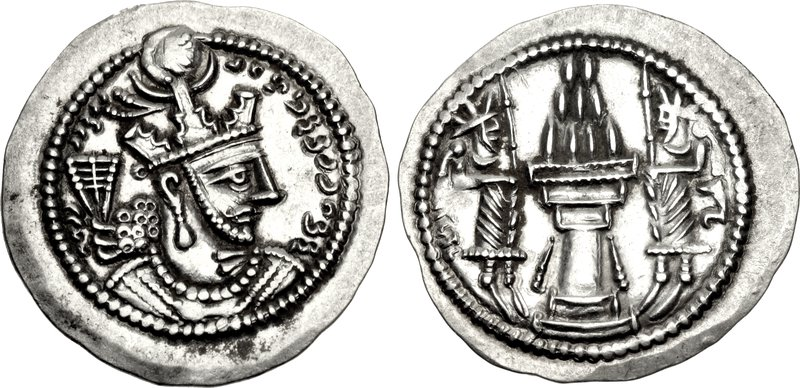
A coin of Yazdegerd II

Bahram V's son Yazdegerd II (438–457) was in some ways a moderate ruler, but, in contrast to Yazdegerd I, he practised a harsh policy towards minority religions, particularly Christianity. However, at the Battle of Avarayr in 451, the Armenian subjects led by Vardan Mamikonian reaffirmed Armenia's right to profess Christianity freely. (Note: "The Armenian defeat in the Battle of Avarayr in 451 proved a pyrrhic victory for the Persians. Though the Armenians lost their commander, Vartan Mamikonian, and most of their soldiers, Persian losses were proportionately heavy, and Armenia was allowed to remain Christian.") This was to be later confirmed by the Nvarsak Treaty (484).

At the beginning of his reign in 441, Yazdegerd II assembled an army of soldiers from various nations, including his Indian allies, and attacked the Byzantine Empire, but peace was soon restored after some small-scale fighting. He then gathered his forces in Nishapur in 443 and launched a prolonged campaign against the Kidarites. After a number of battles he crushed them and drove them out beyond the Oxus river in 450. During his eastern campaign, Yazdegerd II grew suspicious of the Christians in the army and expelled them all from the governing body and army. He then persecuted the Christians in his land, and, to a much lesser extent, the Jews. In order to reestablish Zoroastrianism in Armenia, he crushed an uprising of Armenian Christians at the Battle of Vartanantz in 451. The Armenians, however, remained primarily Christian. In his later years, he was engaged yet again with the Kidarites right up until his death in 457. Hormizd III (457–459), the younger son of Yazdegerd II, then ascended to the throne. During his short rule, he continually fought with his elder brother Peroz I, who had the support of the nobility, and with the Hephthalites in Bactria. He was killed by his brother Peroz in 459.

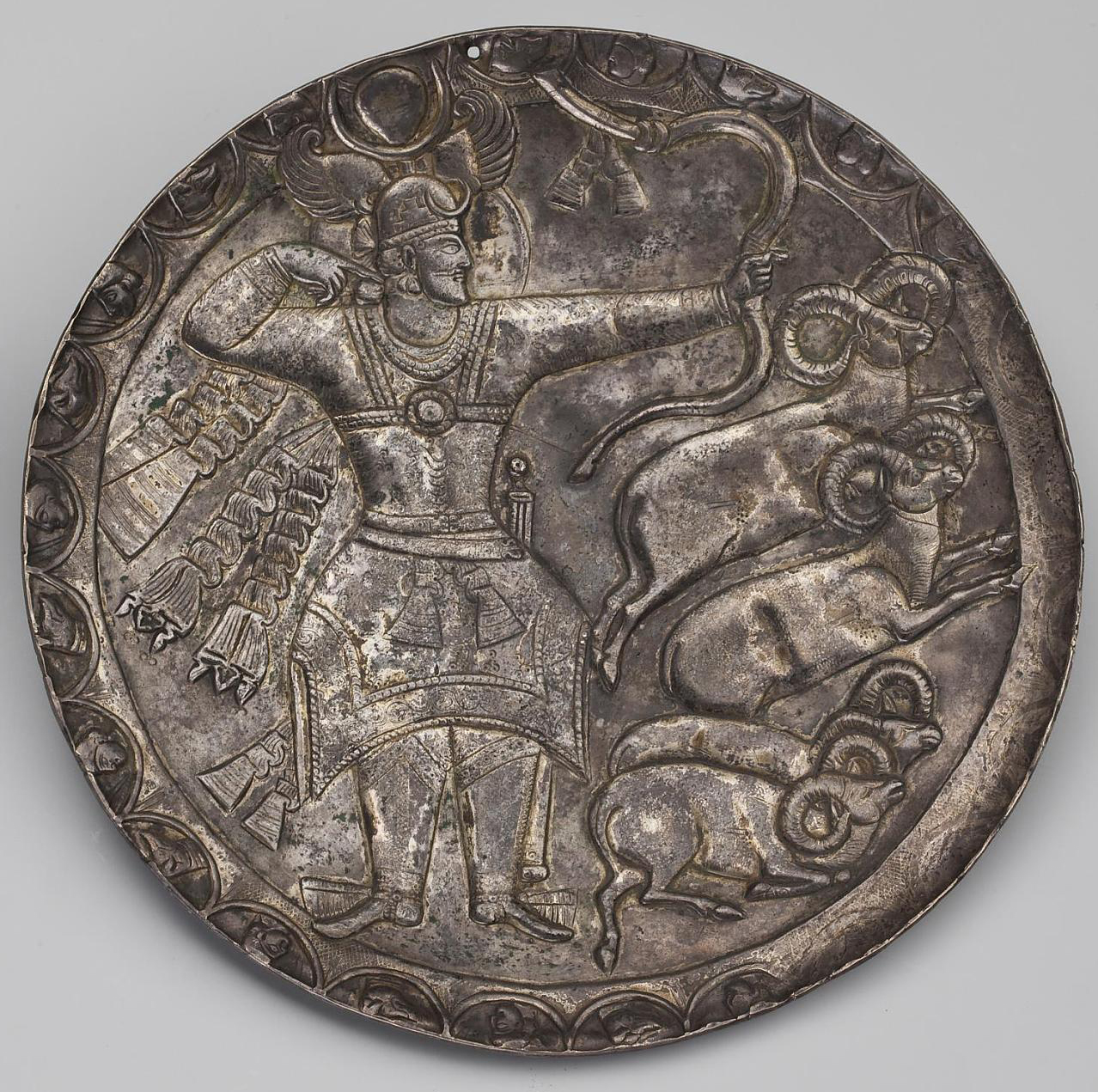
Plate of Peroz I hunting argali

At the beginning of the 5th century, the Hephthalites (White Huns), along with other nomadic groups, attacked Iran. At first Bahram V and Yazdegerd II inflicted decisive defeats against them and drove them back eastward. The Huns returned at the end of the 5th century and defeated Peroz I (457–484) in 483. Following this victory, the Huns invaded and plundered parts of eastern Iran continually for two years. They exacted heavy tribute for some years thereafter.

These attacks brought instability and chaos to the kingdom. Peroz tried again to drive out the Hephthalites, but on the way to Balkh his army was trapped by the Huns in the desert. Peroz was defeated and killed by a Hephthalite army near Balkh. His army was completely destroyed, and his body was never found. Four of his sons and brothers had also died. The main Sasanian cities of the eastern region of Khorasan−Nishapur, Herat, and Marw were now under Hephthalite rule. Sukhra, a member of the Parthian House of Karen, one of the Seven Great Houses of Iran, quickly raised a new force and stopped the Hephthalites from achieving further success. Peroz's brother, Balash, was elected as shah by the Iranian magnates, most notably Sukhra and the Mihranid general Shapur Mihran.

Balash (484–488) was a mild and generous monarch, and showed care towards his subjects, including the Christians. However, he proved unpopular among the nobility and clergy who had him deposed after just four years in 488. Sukhra, who had played a key role in Balash's deposition, appointed Peroz's son Kavad I as the new shah of Iran. According to Miskawayh (d. 1030), Sukhra was Kavad's maternal uncle. Kavad I (488–531) was an energetic and reformist ruler. He gave his support to the sect founded by Mazdak, son of Bamdad, who demanded that the rich should divide their wives and their wealth with the poor. By adopting the doctrine of the Mazdakites, his intention evidently was to break the influence of the magnates and the growing aristocracy. These reforms led to his being deposed and imprisoned in the Castle of Oblivion in Khuzestan, and his younger brother Jamasp (Zamaspes) became king in 496. Kavad, however, quickly escaped and was given refuge by the Hephthalite king.

Jamasp (496–498) was installed on the Sasanian throne upon the deposition of Kavad I by members of the nobility. He was a good and kind king; he reduced taxes in order to improve the condition of the peasants and the poor. He was also an adherent of the mainstream Zoroastrian religion, diversions from which had cost Kavad I his throne and freedom. Jamasp's reign soon ended, however, when Kavad I, at the head of a large army granted to him by the Hephthalite king, returned to the empire's capital. Jamasp stepped down from his position and returned the throne to his brother. No further mention of Jamasp is made after the restoration of Kavad I, but it is widely believed that he was treated favourably at the court of his brother.

=== Second Golden Era (498–622) ===
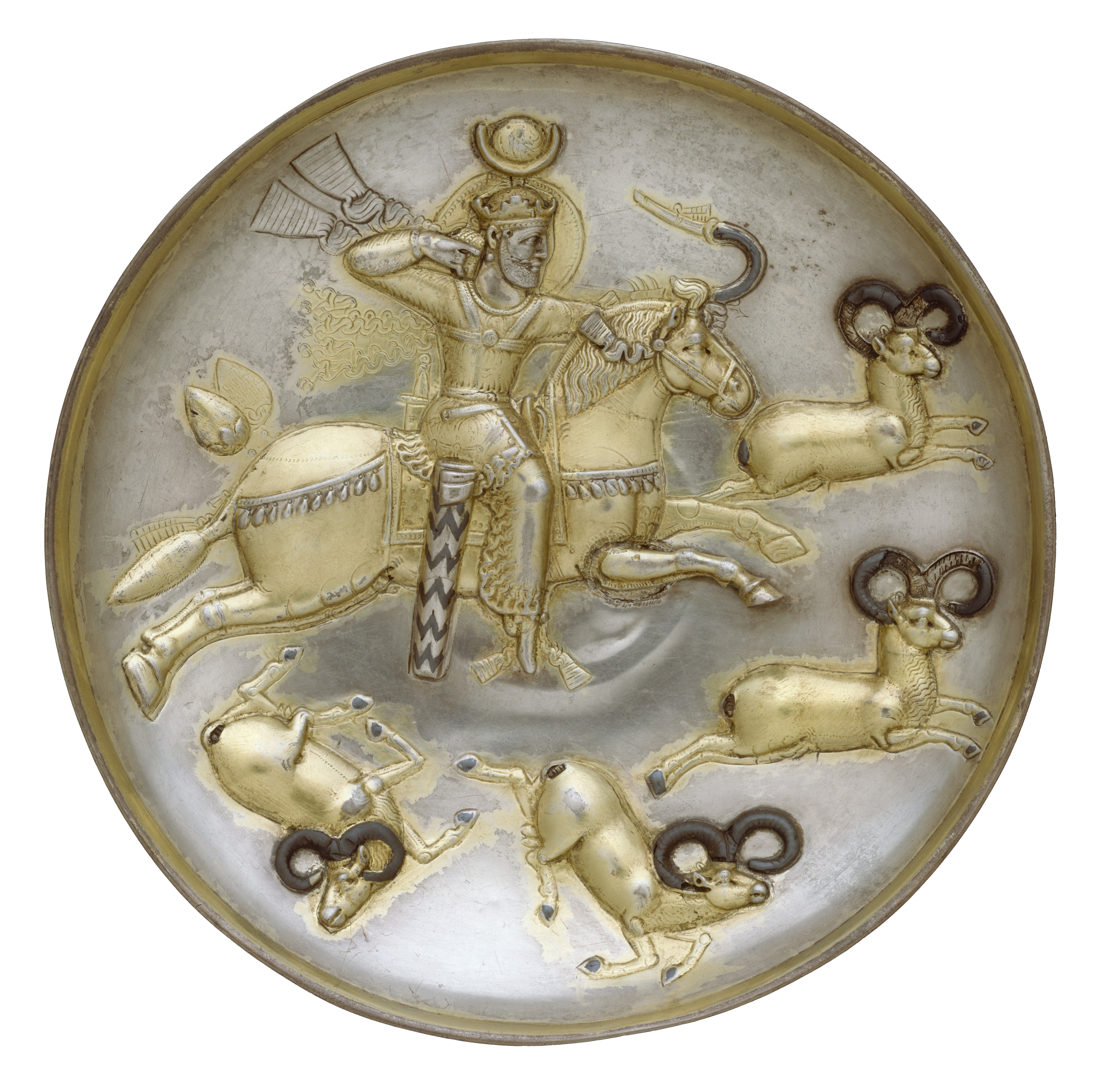
Plate of a Sasanian king hunting rams, perhaps Kavad I (r. 488–496, 498–531)

The second golden era began after the second reign of Kavad I. With the support of the Hephthalites, Kavad launched a campaign against the Romans. In 502, he took Theodosiopolis in Armenia, but lost it soon afterwards. In 503, he took Amida on the Tigris. In 504, an invasion of Armenia by the western Huns from the Caucasus led to an armistice, the return of Amida to Roman control and a peace treaty in 506. In 521/522, Kavad lost control of Lazica, whose rulers switched their allegiance to the Romans; an attempt by the Iberians in 524/525 to do likewise triggered a war between Rome and Persia.

In 527, a Roman offensive against Nisibis was repulsed and Roman efforts to fortify positions near the frontier were thwarted. In 530, Kavad sent an army under Perozes to attack the important Roman frontier city of Dara. The army was met by the Roman general Belisarius, and, though superior in numbers, was defeated at the Battle of Dara. In the same year, a second Persian army under Mihr-Mihroe was defeated at Satala by Roman forces under Sittas and Dorotheus, but in 531 a Persian army accompanied by a Lakhmid contingent under Al-Mundhir III defeated Belisarius at the Battle of Callinicum, and in 532 an "eternal peace" was concluded. Kavad succeeded in restoring order in the interior and fought with general success against the Eastern Romans, founded several cities, some of which were named after him, and began to regulate taxation and internal administration.

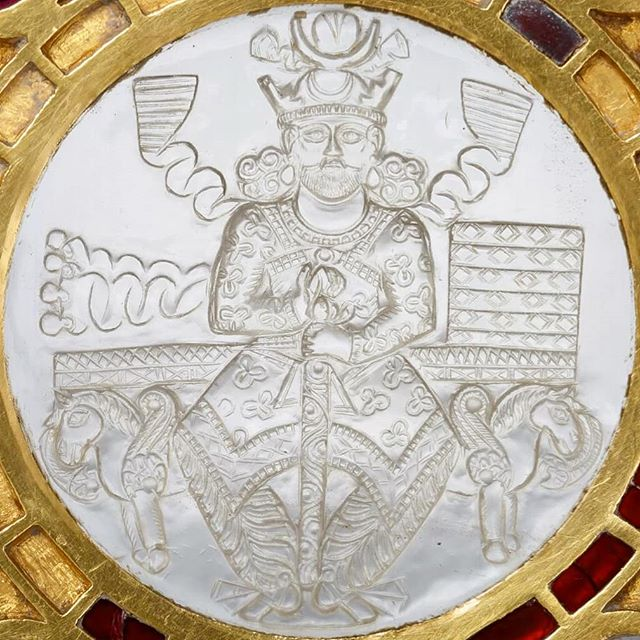
Plate depicting Khosrow I

After the reign of Kavad I, his son Khosrow I, also known as Anushirvan ("with the immortal soul"; ruled 531–579), ascended to the throne. He is the most celebrated of the Sassanid rulers. Khosrow I is most famous for his reforms in the aging governing body of Sasanians. He introduced a rational system of taxation based upon a survey of landed possessions, which his father had begun, and he tried in every way to increase the welfare and the revenues of his empire. Previous great feudal lords fielded their own military equipment, followers, and retainers. Khosrow I developed a new force of dehqans, or "knights", paid and equipped by the central government and the bureaucracy, tying the army and bureaucracy more closely to the central government than to local lords.

Emperor Justinian I (527–565) paid Khosrow I 440,000 pieces of gold as a part of the "eternal peace" treaty of 532. In 540, Khosrow broke the treaty and invaded Syria, sacking Antioch and extorting large sums of money from a number of other cities. Further successes followed: in 541 Lazica defected to the Persian side, and in 542 a major Byzantine offensive in Armenia was defeated at Anglon. Also in 541, Khosrow I entered Lazica at the invitation of its king, captured the main Byzantine stronghold at Petra, and established another protectorate over the country, commencing the Lazic War. A five-year truce agreed to in 545 was interrupted in 547 when Lazica again switched sides and eventually expelled its Persian garrison with Byzantine help; the war resumed but remained confined to Lazica, which was retained by the Byzantines when peace was concluded in 562.

In 565, Justinian I died and was succeeded by Justin II (565–578), who resolved to stop subsidies to Arab chieftains to restrain them from raiding Byzantine territory in Syria. A year earlier, the Sassanid governor of Armenia, Chihor-Vishnasp of the Suren family, built a fire temple at Dvin near modern Yerevan, and he put to death an influential member of the Mamikonian family, touching off a revolt which led to the massacre of the Persian governor and his guard in 571, while rebellion also broke out in Iberia. Justin II took advantage of the Armenian revolt to stop his yearly payments to Khosrow I for the defense of the Caucasus passes.

The Armenians were welcomed as allies, and an army was sent into Sassanid territory which besieged Nisibis in 573. However, dissension among the Byzantine generals not only led to an abandonment of the siege, but they in turn were besieged in the city of Dara, which was taken by the Persians. Capitalizing on this success, the Persians then ravaged Syria, causing Justin II to agree to make annual payments in exchange for a five-year truce on the Mesopotamian front, although the war continued elsewhere. In 576 Khosrow I led his last campaign, an offensive into Anatolia which sacked Sebasteia and Melitene, but ended in disaster: defeated outside Melitene, the Persians suffered heavy losses as they fled across the Euphrates under Byzantine attack. Taking advantage of Persian disarray, the Byzantines raided deep into Khosrow's territory, even mounting amphibious attacks across the Caspian Sea. Khosrow sued for peace, but he decided to continue the war after a victory by his general Tamkhosrow in Armenia in 577, and fighting resumed in Mesopotamia. The Armenian revolt came to an end with a general amnesty, which brought Armenia back into the Sassanid Empire.

Around 570, "Ma 'd-Karib", half-brother of the King of Yemen, requested Khosrow I's intervention. Khosrow I sent a fleet and a small army under a commander called Vahriz to the area near present Aden, and they marched against the capital San'a'l, which was occupied. Saif, son of Mard-Karib, who had accompanied the expedition, became King sometime between 575 and 577. Thus, the Sassanids were able to establish a base in South Arabia to control the sea trade with the east. Later, the south Arabian kingdom renounced Sassanid overlordship, and another Persian expedition was sent in 598 that successfully annexed southern Arabia as a Sassanid province, which lasted until the time of troubles after Khosrow II.

Khosrow I's reign witnessed the rise of the dehqans (literally, village lords), the petty landholding nobility who were the backbone of later Sassanid provincial administration and the tax collection system. Khosrow I built infrastructure, embellishing his capital and founding new towns with the construction of new buildings. He rebuilt the canals and restocked the farms destroyed in the wars. He built strong fortifications at the passes and placed subject tribes in carefully chosen towns on the frontiers to act as guardians against invaders. He was tolerant of all religions, though he decreed that Zoroastrianism should be the official state religion, and was not unduly disturbed when one of his sons became a Christian.

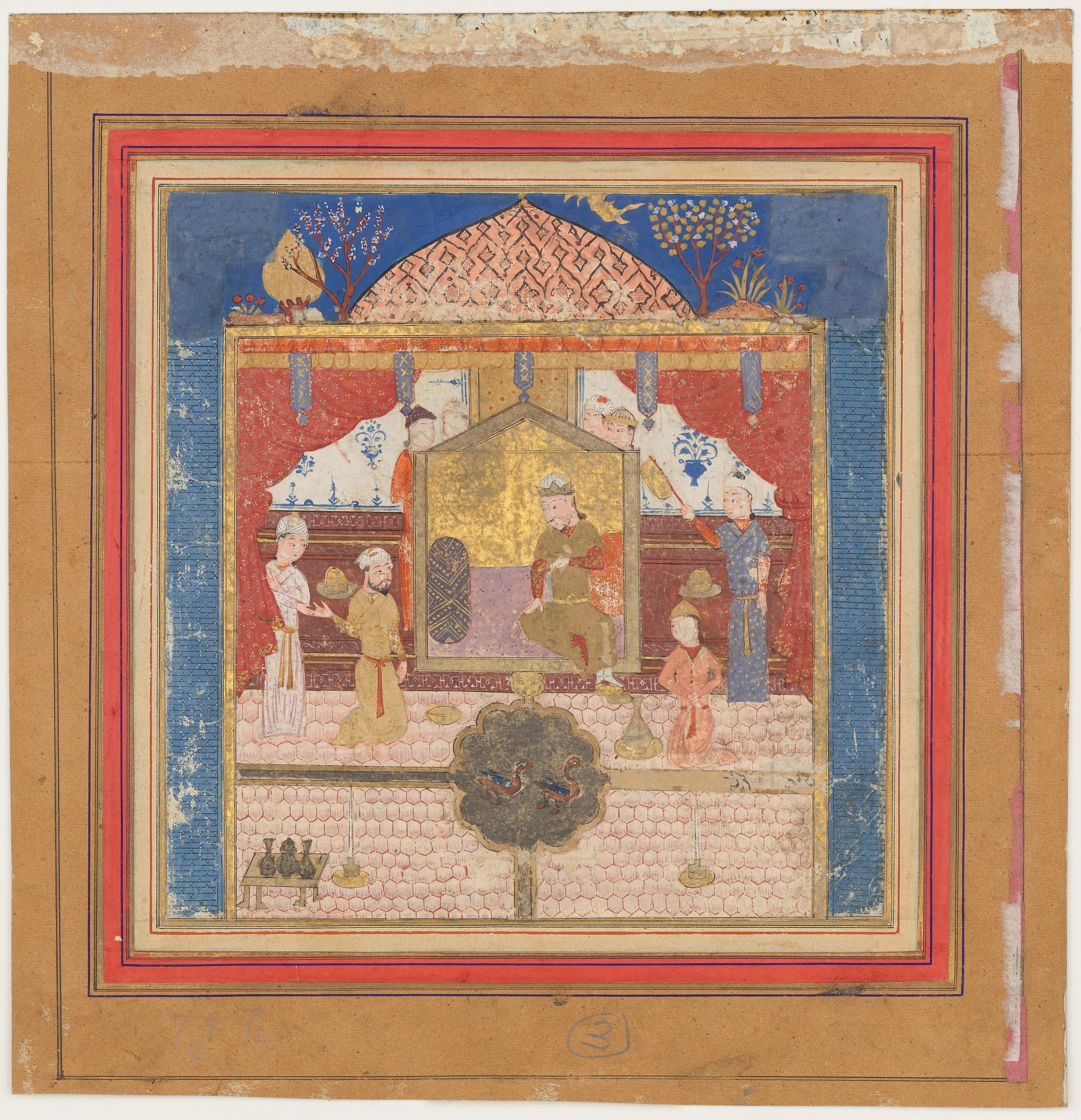
15th-century Shahnameh illustration of Hormizd IV seated on his throne

After Khosrow I, Hormizd IV (579–590) took the throne. The war with the Byzantines continued to rage intensely but inconclusively until the general Bahram Chobin, dismissed and humiliated by Hormizd, rose in revolt in 589. The following year, Hormizd was overthrown by a palace coup and his son Khosrow II (590–628) placed on the throne. However, this change of ruler failed to placate Bahram, who defeated Khosrow, forcing him to flee to Byzantine territory, and seized the throne for himself as Bahram VI. Khosrow asked the Byzantine Emperor Maurice (582–602) for assistance against Bahram, offering to cede the western Caucasus to the Byzantines. To cement the alliance, Khosrow also married Maurice's daughter Miriam. Under the command of Khosrow and the Byzantine generals Narses and John Mystacon, the new combined Byzantine-Persian army raised a rebellion against Bahram, defeating him at the Battle of Blarathon in 591. When Khosrow was subsequently restored to power he kept his promise, handing over control of western Armenia and Caucasian Iberia.

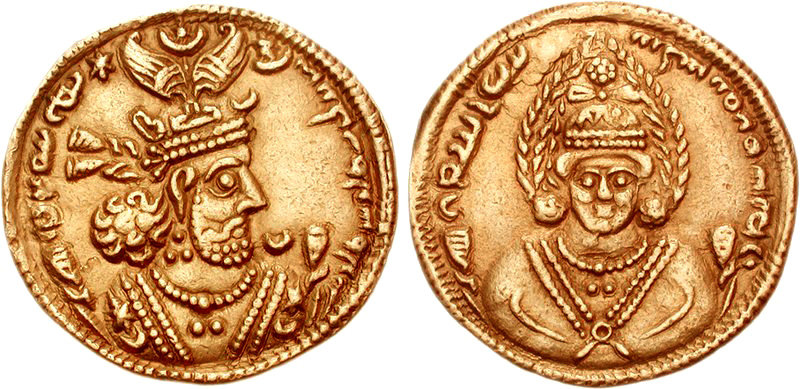
Coin of Khosrow II

The new peace arrangement allowed the two empires to focus on military matters elsewhere: Khosrow focused on the Sassanid Empire's eastern frontier while Maurice restored Byzantine control of the Balkans. Circa 600, the Hephthalites had been raiding the Sassanid Empire as far as Spahan in central Iran. The Hephthalites issued numerous coins imitating the coinage of Khosrow II. In c. 606/607, Khosrow recalled Smbat IV Bagratuni from Persian Armenia and sent him to Iran to repel the Hephthalites. Smbat, with the aid of a Persian prince named Datoyean, repelled the Hephthalites from Persia, and plundered their domains in eastern Khorasan, where Smbat is said to have killed their king in single combat.

After Maurice was overthrown and killed by Phocas (602–610) in 602, however, Khosrow II used the murder of his benefactor as a pretext to begin a new invasion, which benefited from continuing civil war in the Byzantine Empire and met little effective resistance. Khosrow's generals systematically subdued the heavily fortified frontier cities of Byzantine Mesopotamia and Armenia, laying the foundations for unprecedented expansion. The Persians overran Syria and captured Antioch in 611.

In 613, outside Antioch, the Persian generals Shahrbaraz and Shahin decisively defeated a major counter-attack led in person by the Byzantine emperor Heraclius. Thereafter, the Persian advance continued unchecked. Jerusalem fell in 614, Alexandria in 619, and the rest of Egypt by 621. The Sassanid dream of restoring the Achaemenid boundaries was almost complete, while the Byzantine Empire was on the verge of collapse. This remarkable peak of expansion was paralleled by a blossoming of Persian art, music, and architecture.

=== Decline and collapse (622–651) ===
While successful at its first stage (from 602 to 622), the campaign of Khosrow II had actually exhausted the Persian army and treasuries. In an effort to rebuild the national treasuries, Khosrow overtaxed the population. Thus, while his empire was on the verge of total defeat, Heraclius (610–641) drew on all his diminished and devastated empire's remaining resources, reorganised his armies, and mounted a remarkable, risky counter-offensive. Between 622 and 627, he campaigned against the Persians in Anatolia and the Caucasus, winning a string of victories against Persian forces under Shahrbaraz, Shahin, and Shahraplakan (whose competition to claim the glory of personally defeating the Byzantine emperor contributed to their failure), sacking the great Zoroastrian temple at Ganzak, and securing assistance from the Khazars and Western Turkic Khaganate.

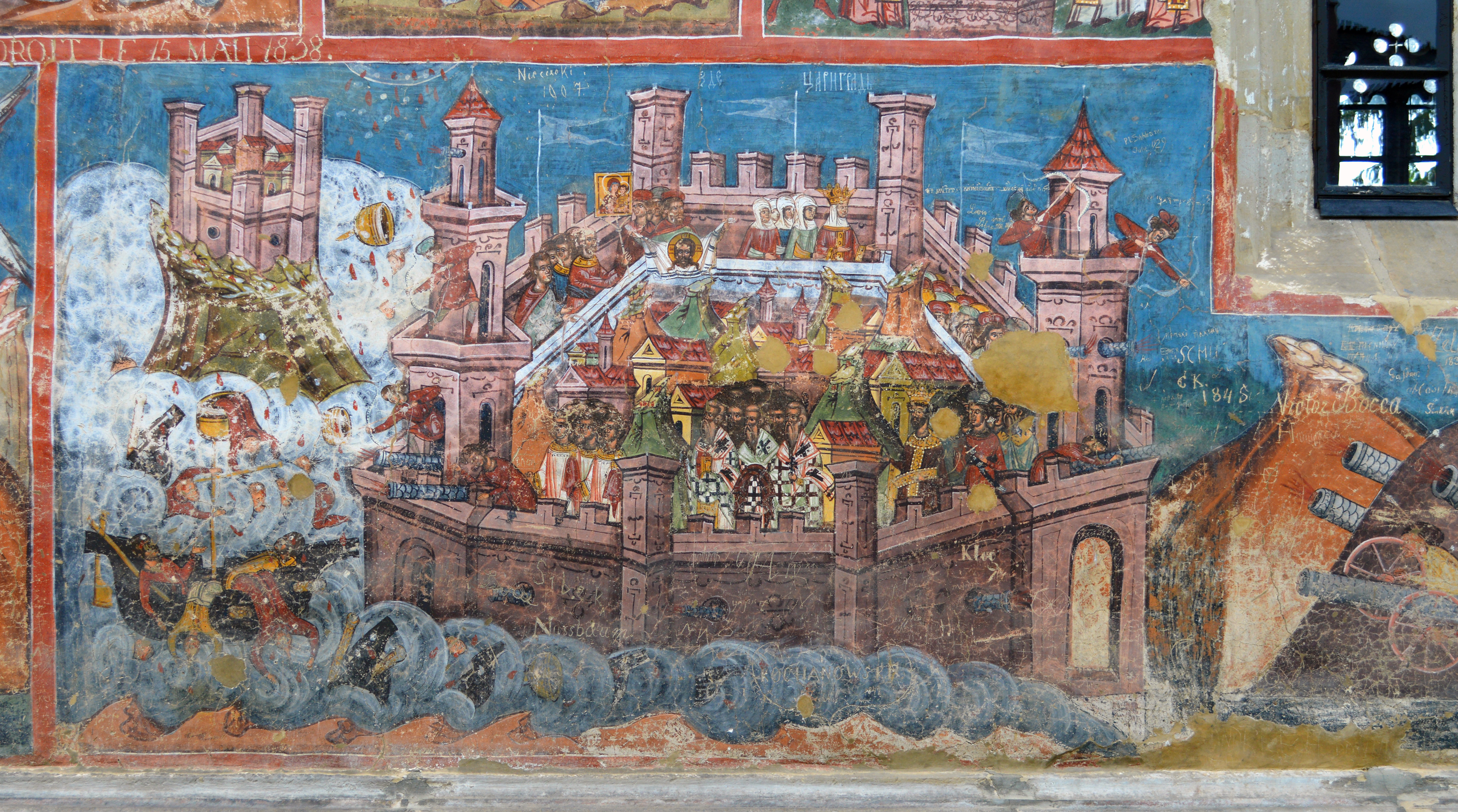
The Siege of Constantinople in 626 by the combined Sassanid, Avar, and Slavic forces depicted on the murals of the Moldovița Monastery, Romania

In response, Khosrow, in coordination with Avar and Slavic forces, launched a siege on the Byzantine capital of Constantinople in 626. The Sassanids, led by Shahrbaraz, attacked the city on the eastern side of the Bosphorus, while his Avar and Slavic allies invaded from the western side. Attempts to ferry the Persian forces across the Bosphorus to aid their allies (the Sassanid forces being by far the most capable in siege warfare) were blocked by the Byzantine fleet, and the siege ended in failure. In 627–628, Heraclius mounted a winter invasion of Mesopotamia, and, despite the departure of his Khazar allies, defeated a Persian army commanded by Rhahzadh in the Battle of Nineveh. He then marched down the Tigris, devastating the country and sacking Khosrow's palace at Dastagerd. He was prevented from attacking Ctesiphon by the destruction of the bridges on the Nahrawan Canal and conducted further raids before withdrawing up the Diyala into north-western Iran.

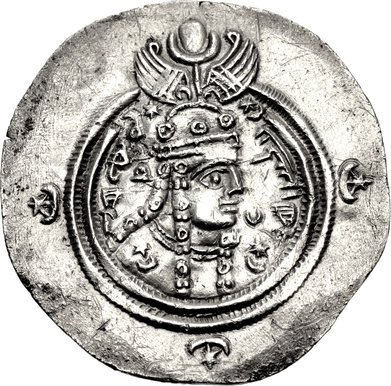
Queen Boran, daughter of Khosrow II, the first woman and one of the last rulers on the throne of the Sasanian Empire. She reigned from 17 June 629 to 16 June 630.

The impact of Heraclius's victories, the devastation of the richest territories of the Sasanian Empire, and the humiliating destruction of high-profile targets such as Ganzak and Dastagerd fatally undermined Khosrow's prestige and his support among the Persian aristocracy. In early 628, he was overthrown and murdered by his son Kavadh II (628), who immediately brought an end to the war, agreeing to withdraw from all occupied territories. In 629, Heraclius restored the True Cross to Jerusalem in a majestic ceremony. Kavadh died within months, and chaos and civil war followed. Over a period of four years and five successive kings, the Sasanian Empire weakened considerably. The power of the central authority passed into the hands of the generals. It would take several years for a strong king to emerge from a series of coups, and the Sassanids never had time to recover fully.

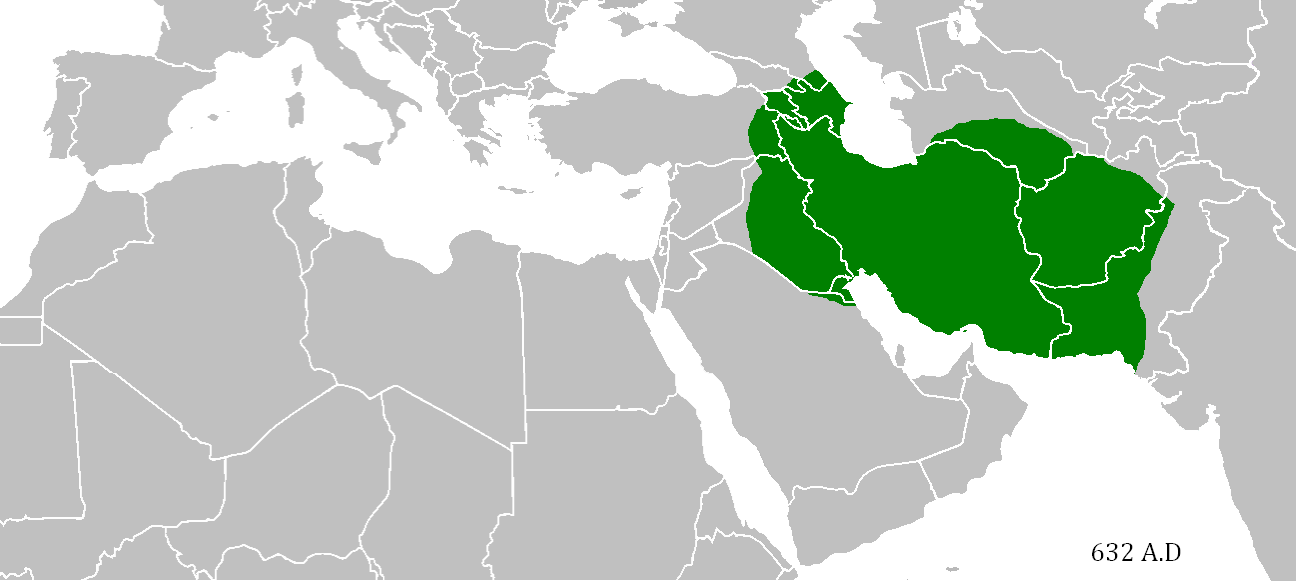
Extent of the Sasanian Empire in 632 with modern borders superimposed

In early 632, a grandson of Khosrow I, who had lived in hiding in Estakhr, Yazdegerd III, acceded to the throne. The same year, the first raiders from the Arab tribes, newly united by Islam, arrived in Persian territory. According to Howard-Johnston, years of warfare had exhausted both the Byzantines and the Persians. The Sasanians were further weakened by economic decline, heavy taxation, religious unrest, rigid social stratification, the increasing power of the provincial landholders, and a rapid turnover of rulers, facilitating the Islamic conquest of Persia.

The Sasanians never mounted a truly effective resistance to the pressure applied by the initial Arab armies. Yazdegerd was a boy at the mercy of his advisers and incapable of uniting a vast country crumbling into small feudal kingdoms, despite the fact that the Byzantines, under similar pressure from the newly expansive Arabs, were no longer a threat. Caliph Abu Bakr's commander Khalid ibn Walid, once one of Muhammad's chosen companions-in-arms and leader of the Arab army, moved to capture Iraq in a series of lightning battles. Redeployed to the Syrian front against the Byzantines in June 634, Khalid's successor in Iraq failed him, and the Muslims were defeated in the Battle of the Bridge in 634. However, the Arab threat did not stop there and reemerged shortly via the disciplined armies of Khalid ibn Walid.

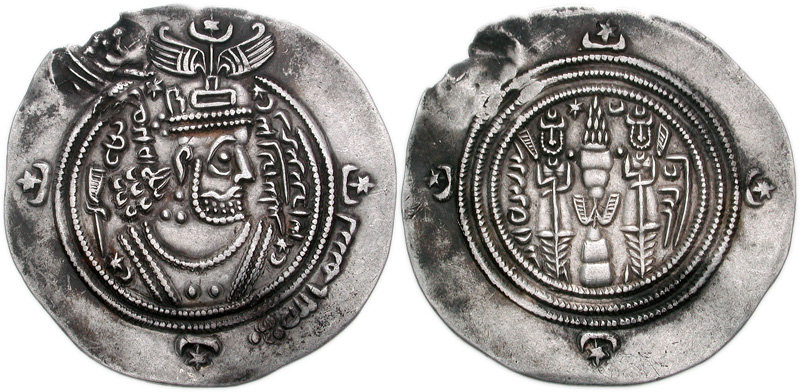
Umayyad Caliphate coin from the time of Caliph Mu'awiya I imitating coins minted under Khosrow II. The coin, minted in Basra in 675/6 AD, depicts the governor Ubayd Allah ibn Ziyad.

In 637, a Muslim army under the Caliph Umar ibn al-Khattāb defeated a larger Persian force led by General Rostam Farrokhzad at the plains of al-Qādisiyyah, and then advanced on Ctesiphon, which fell after a prolonged siege. Yazdegerd fled eastward from Ctesiphon, leaving behind him most of the empire's vast treasury. The Arabs captured Ctesiphon shortly afterward. Thus, the Muslims were able to seize a powerful financial resource, leaving the Sassanid government strapped for funds. A number of Sassanid governors attempted to combine their forces to throw back the invaders, but the effort was crippled by the lack of a strong central authority, and the governors were defeated at the Battle of Nihawānd. The empire, with its military command structure non-existent, its non-noble troop levies decimated, its financial resources effectively destroyed, and the Asawaran (Azatan) knightly caste destroyed piecemeal, was now utterly helpless in the face of the Arab invaders.

Upon hearing of the defeat in Nihawānd, Yazdegerd along with Farrukhzad and some of the Persian nobles fled further inland to the eastern province of Khorasan. Yazdegerd was assassinated by a miller in Merv in late 651. His sons, Peroz and Bahram, fled to Tang China. Some of the nobles settled in Central Asia, where they contributed greatly to spreading the Persian culture and language in those regions and to the establishment of the first native Iranian Islamic dynasty, the Samanid dynasty, which sought to revive Sasanian traditions.

The abrupt fall of the Sasanian Empire was completed in a period of just five years, and most of its territory was absorbed into the Islamic caliphate; however, many Iranian cities resisted and fought against the invaders several times. Islamic caliphates repeatedly suppressed revolts in cities such as Rey, Isfahan, and Hamadan. The local population was initially under little pressure to convert to Islam, remaining as dhimmi subjects of the Muslim state and paying the jizya tax. In addition, the old Sasanian "land tax" (known in Arabic as kharaj) was also adopted. Caliph Umar is said to have occasionally set up a commission to survey the taxes, to judge if they were more than the land could bear.

The Sasanian Empire was the last native Iranian government before the Arab invasion.

=== Descended nobility ===
It is believed that the following dynasties and noble families had ancestors among the Sasanian rulers:

- The Dabuyid dynasty (642–760) descendant of Jamasp.
- The Paduspanids (665–1598) of Mazandaran, descendant of Jamasp.
- The shahs of Shirwan (1100–1382) from Hormizd IV's line.
- The Banu Munajjim (9th–10th century) from Mihr Gushnasp, a Sasanian prince.
- The Kamkarian family (9th–10th century) a dehqan family descended from Yazdegerd III.
- The Mikalids (9th–11th century) a family descended from the Sogdian ruler Divashtich, who was in turn a descendant of Bahram V.

== Government ==
The Sasanians established an empire roughly within the frontiers achieved by the Parthian Arsacids, with the capital at Ctesiphon in the Asoristan province. In administering this empire, Sassanid rulers took the title of shahanshah (King of Kings), becoming the central overlords and also assumed guardianship of the sacred fire, the symbol of the national religion. This symbol is explicit on Sasanian coins where the reigning monarch, with his crown and regalia of office, appears on the obverse, backed by the sacred fire, the symbol of the national religion, on the coin's reverse. Sassanid queens had the title of banbishnan banbishn (Queen of Queens).

On a smaller scale, the territory might also be ruled by a number of petty rulers from a noble family, known as shahrdar, overseen directly by the shahanshah. The districts of the provinces were ruled by a shahrab and a mowbed (chief priest). The mowbed dealt with estates and other legal matters. Sasanian rule was characterized by considerable centralization, ambitious urban planning, agricultural development, and technological improvements. Below the king, a powerful bureaucracy carried out much of the affairs of government; the head of the bureaucracy was the wuzurg framadar (vizier or prime minister). Within this bureaucracy the Zoroastrian priesthood was immensely powerful. Below the emperor, the most powerful men of the Sassanid state were his chief officials: the mowbedan mowbed, the head of the priestly class (magi); the spahbed, the commander-in-chief; the hutukhshbed, the head of traders and merchants' syndicate; and the minister of agriculture, the wastaryoshan-salar, who was also head of farmers.

Formally absolute monarchs, the Sasanian rulers usually considered the advice of their ministers. A 10th-century Muslim historian, al-Masudi, praised the "excellent administration of the Sasanian kings, their well-ordered policy, their care for their subjects, and the prosperity of their domains". In normal times, the monarchical office was hereditary, but might be transferred by the king to a younger son; in two instances the supreme power was held by queens. When no direct heir was available, the nobles and prelates chose a ruler, but their choice was restricted to members of the royal family.

The Sasanian nobility was a mixture of old Parthian clans, Persian aristocratic families, and noble families from subjected territories. Many new noble families had risen after the dissolution of the Parthian dynasty, while several of the once-dominant Seven Parthian clans remained of high importance. At the court of Ardashir I, the old Arsacid families of the House of Karen and the House of Suren, along with several other families, the Varazes and Andigans, held positions of great honor. Alongside these Iranian and non-Iranian noble families, the kings of Merv, Abarshahr, Kirman, Sakastan, Iberia, and Adiabene, who are mentioned as holding positions of honor amongst the nobles, appeared at the court of the shahanshah. Indeed, the extensive domains of the Surens, Karens, and Varazes, had become part of the original Sassanid state as semi-independent states. Thus, the noble families that attended at the court of the Sassanid empire continued to be ruling lines in their own right, although subordinate to the shahanshah.

In general, wuzurgan from Iranian families held the most powerful positions in the imperial administration, including governorships of border provinces (marzban). Most of these positions were patrimonial, and many were passed down through a single family for generations. The marzbans of greatest seniority were permitted a silver throne, while marzbans of the most strategic border provinces, such as the Caucasus province, were allowed a golden throne. In military campaigns, the regional marzbans could be regarded as field marshals, while lesser spahbeds could command a field army.

Culturally, the Sasanians implemented a system of social stratification. This system was supported by Zoroastrianism, which was established as the state religion. Other religions appear to have been largely tolerated, although this claim has been debated. Sassanid emperors consciously sought to resuscitate Persian traditions and to obliterate Greek cultural influence.

According to historian Scott McDonough and Kaveh Farrokh, a key principle of the Sasanian Empire's monarchy was to defend the Aryan settlers and culture of the realm. (Note: The term "Aryan" here refers to the Iranic branch of the Indo-Europeans specifically.) This included the integration and protection of the Parthians and other Iranic peoples. The Sasanians extended Aryan identity to Armenians who already had strong ties to the Iranic world, notably due to their admixture with the Parthians.

=== Sasanian military ===
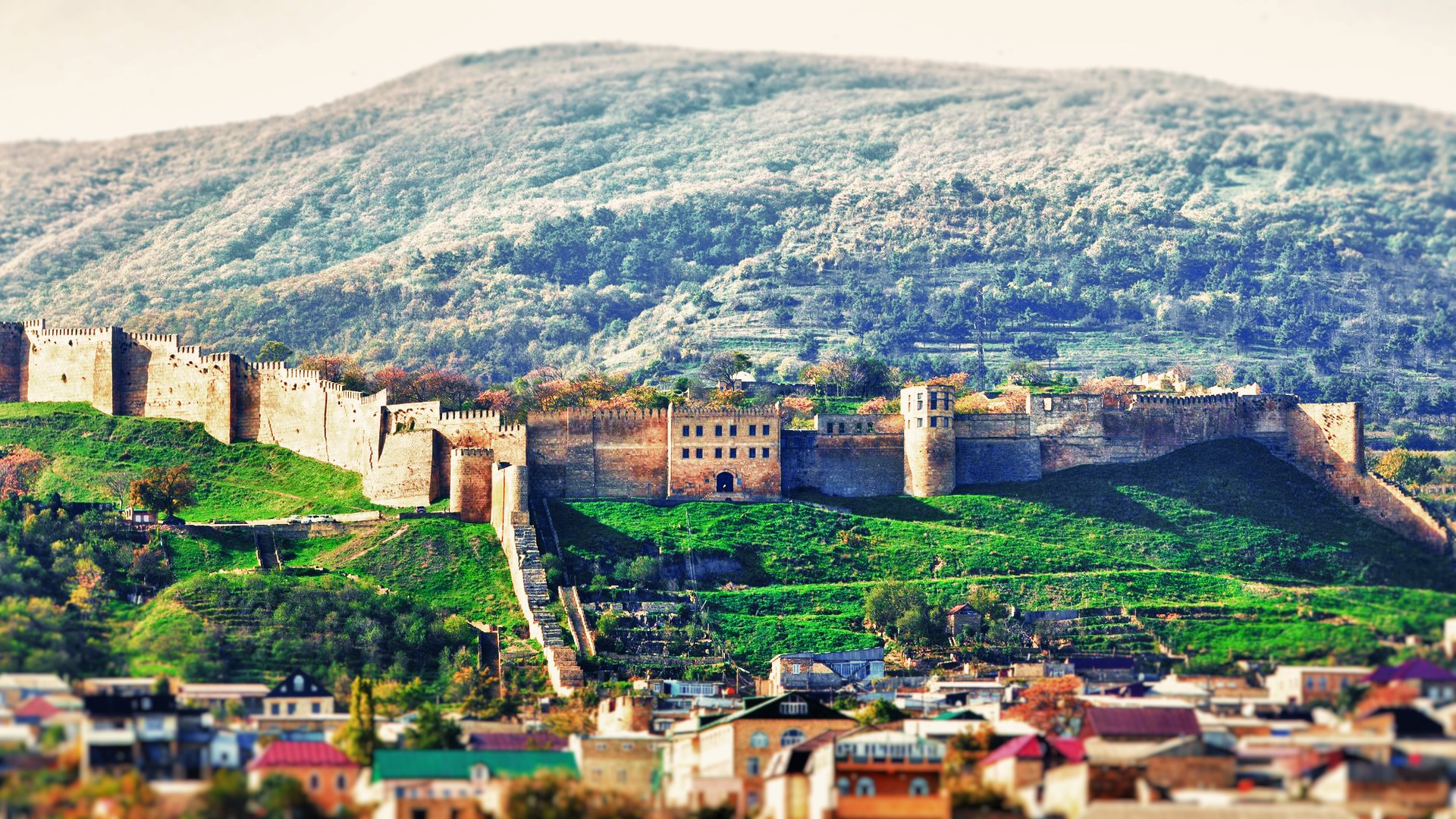
The Walls of Derbent, part of the Sasanian defense lines

The active army of the Sasanian Empire originated from Ardashir I, the first shahanshah of the empire. Ardashir restored the Achaemenid military organizations, retained the Parthian cavalry model, and employed new types of armour and siege warfare techniques.

==== Role of priests ====
The relationship between priests and warriors was important, because the concept of Ērānshahr had been revived by the priests. Disagreements between the priests and the warriors led to fragmentation within the empire, which led to its downfall.

==== Infantry ====
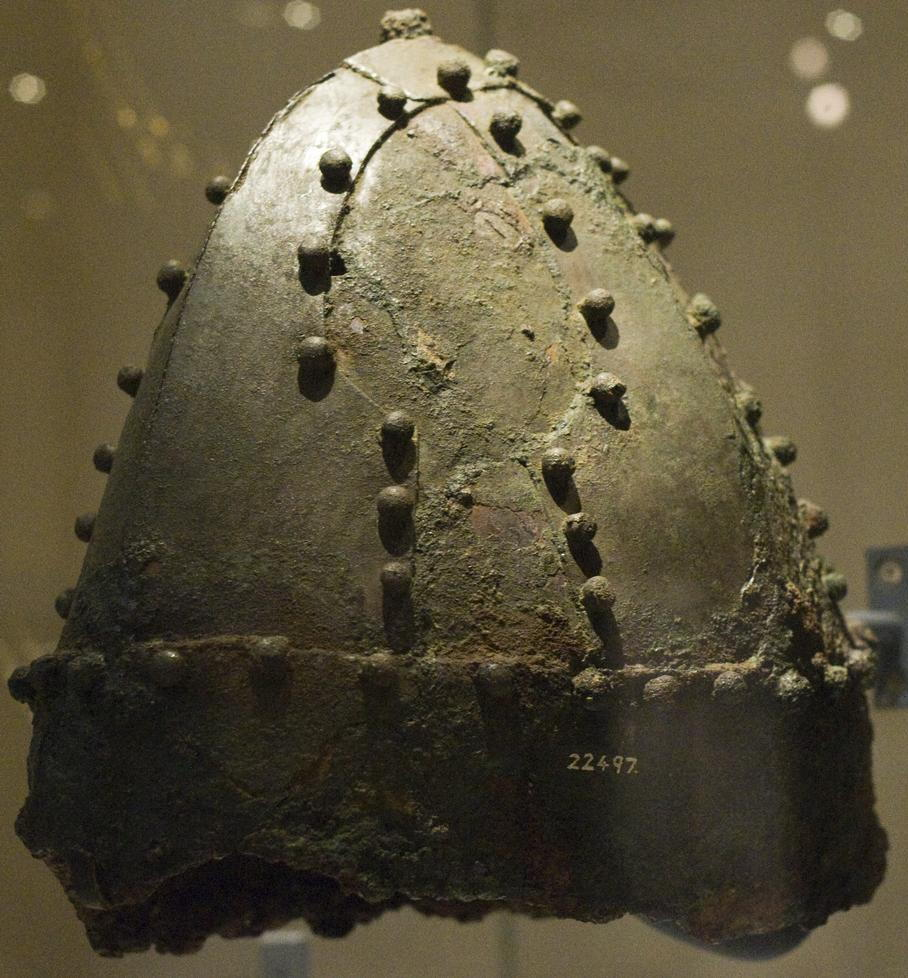
Sasanian army helmet

The Paygan formed the bulk of the Sasanian infantry, and were often recruited from the peasant population. Each unit was headed by an officer called a "Paygan-salar", which meant "commander of the infantry" and their main task was to guard the baggage train, serve as pages to the Asvaran (a higher rank), storm fortification walls, undertake entrenchment projects, and excavate mines.

Those serving in the infantry were fitted with shields and lances. To make the size of their army larger, the Sasanians added soldiers provided by the Medes and the Dailamites to their own. The Medes provided the Sasanian army with high-quality javelin throwers, slingers, and heavy infantry. Iranian infantry are described by Ammianus Marcellinus as "armed like gladiators" and "obey orders like so many horse-boys". The Dailamite people also served as infantry and were Iranian people who lived mainly within Gilan, Iranian Azerbaijan and Mazandaran. They are reported as having fought with weapons such as daggers, swords, and javelins and reputed to have been recognized by Romans for their skills and hardiness in close-quarter combat. One account of Dailamites recounted their participation in an invasion of Yemen where 800 of them were led by the Dailamite officer Vahriz. Vahriz would eventually defeat the Arab forces in Yemen and its capital Sana'a making it a Sasanian vassal until the invasion of Persia by Arabs.

==== Navy ====
The Sasanian navy was an important constituent of the Sasanian military from the time that Ardashir I conquered the Arab side of the Persian Gulf. Because controlling the Persian Gulf was an economic necessity, the Sasanian navy worked to keep it safe from piracy, prevent Roman encroachment, and keep the Arab tribes from getting hostile. However, it is believed by many historians that the naval force could not have been a strong one, as the men serving in the navy were those who were confined in prisons. The leader of the navy bore the title of nāvbed.

==== Cavalry ====
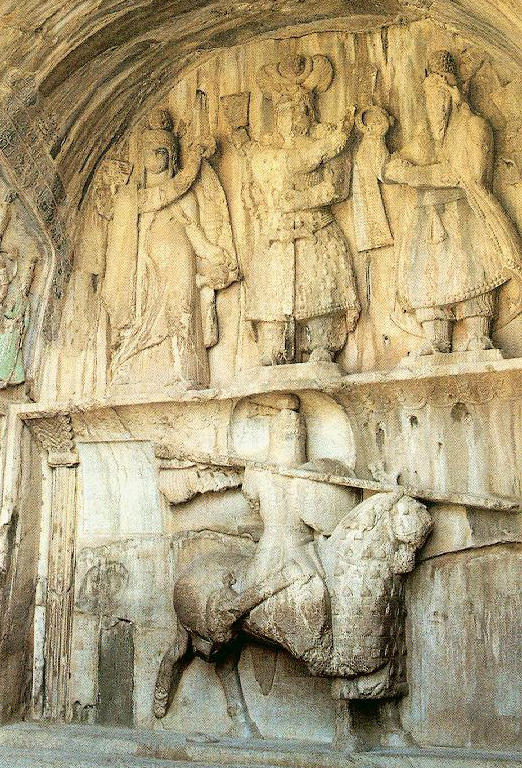
A Sasanian king posing as an armored cavalryman, Taq-e Bostan, Iran

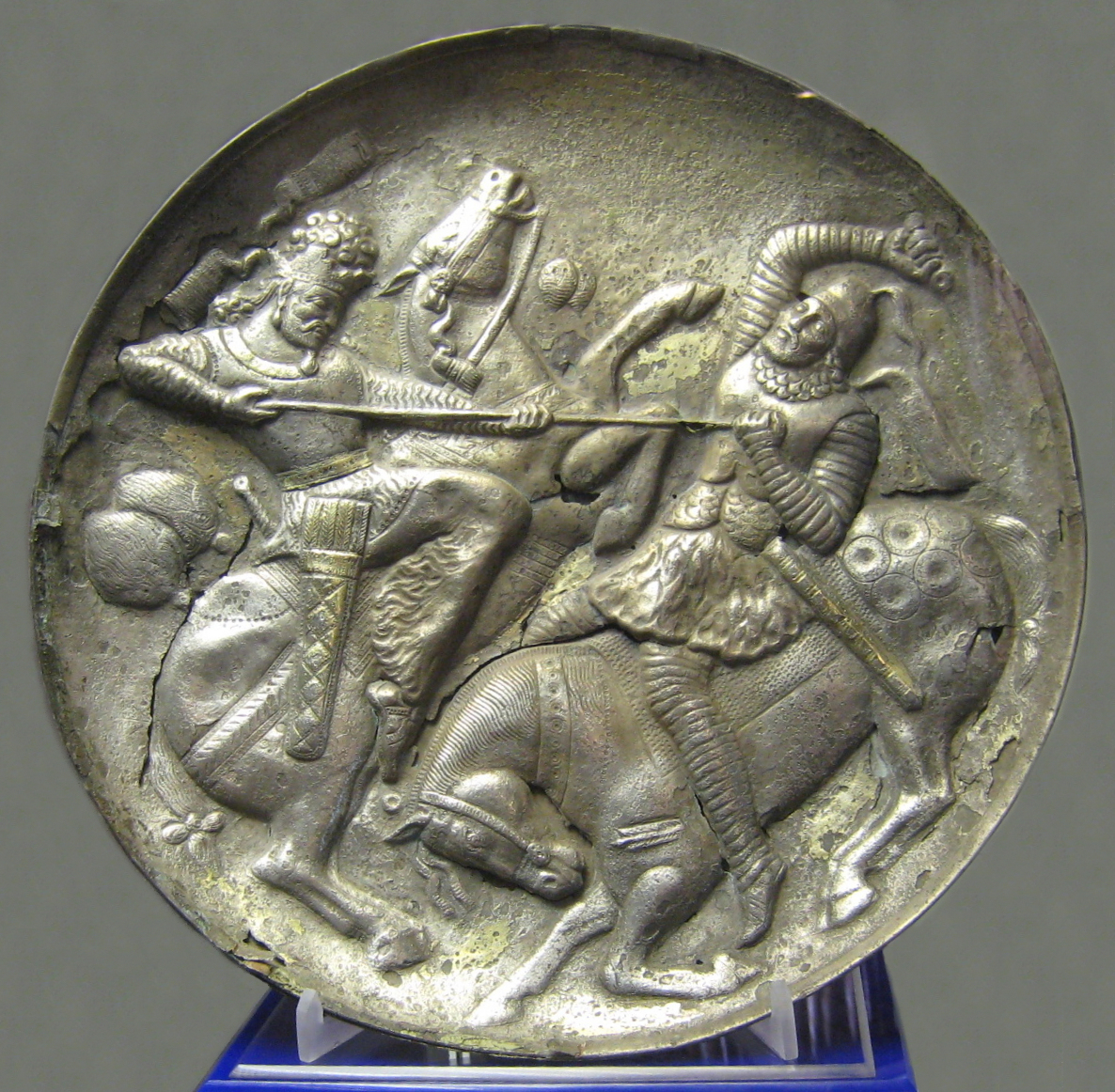
Sasanian silver plate showing lance combat between two nobles

The cavalry used during the Sasanian Empire were two types of heavy cavalry units: Clibanarii and Cataphracts. The first cavalry force, composed of elite noblemen trained since youth for military service, was supported by light cavalry, infantry and archers. Mercenaries and tribal people of the empire, including the Turks, Kushans, Sarmatians, Khazars, Georgians, and Armenians were included in these first cavalry units. The second cavalry involved the use of the war elephants. In fact, it was their specialty to deploy elephants as cavalry support.

Unlike the Parthians, the Sasanians developed advanced siege engines. The development of siege weapons was a useful weapon during conflicts with Rome, in which success hinged upon the ability to seize cities and other fortified points; conversely, the Sassanids also developed a number of techniques for defending their own cities from attack. The Sasanian army was much like the preceding Parthian army, although some of the Sassanid's heavy cavalry were equipped with lances, while Parthian armies were heavily equipped with bows. The Roman historian Ammianus Marcellinus's description of Shapur II's clibanarii cavalry manifestly shows how heavily equipped it was, and how only a portion were spear equipped:

All the companies were clad in iron, and all parts of their bodies were covered with thick plates, so fitted that the stiff-joints conformed with those of their limbs; and the forms of human faces were so skillfully fitted to their heads, that since their entire body was covered with metal, arrows that fell upon them could lodge only where they could see a little through tiny openings opposite the pupil of the eye, or where through the tip of their nose they were able to get a little breath. Of these, some who were armed with pikes, stood so motionless that you would have thought them held fast by clamps of bronze.

Horsemen in the Sasanian cavalry lacked a stirrup. Instead, they used a war saddle which had a cantle at the back and two guard clamps which curved across the top of the rider's thighs. This allowed the horsemen to stay in the saddle at all times during the battle, especially during violent encounters.

The Byzantine emperor Maurikios also emphasizes in his Strategikon that many of the Sassanid heavy cavalry did not carry spears, relying on their bows as their primary weapons. Conversely the Taq-e Bostan reliefs and Al-Tabari's famed list of equipment required for dihqan knights included the lance.

The amount of money involved in maintaining a warrior of the Asawaran (Azatan) knightly caste required a small estate, and the Asawaran (Azatan) knightly caste received that from the throne, and in return, were the throne's most notable defenders in time of war.

== Relations with neighboring powers ==
=== Roman Empire ===
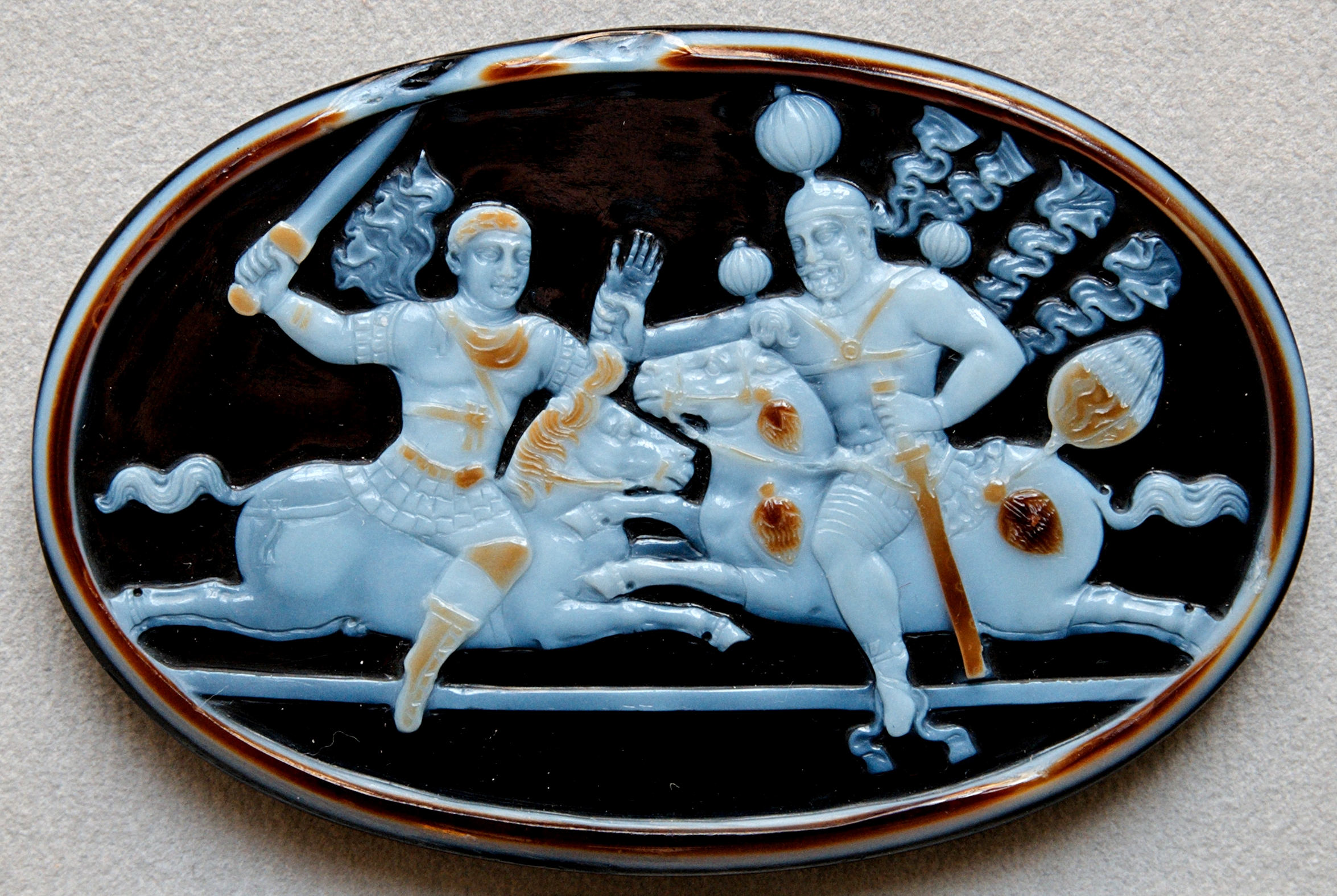
A fine cameo showing an equestrian combat of Shapur I and Roman emperor Valerian in which the Roman emperor is seized following the Battle of Edessa, according to Shapur's own statement, "with our own hand", in 260

The Sasanians, like the Parthians, were in constant hostilities with the Roman Empire. The Sasanians, who succeeded the Parthians, were recognized as one of the leading world powers alongside its neighboring rival the Byzantine Empire, or Eastern Roman Empire, for a period of more than 400 years. Following the division of the Roman Empire in 395, the Byzantine Empire, with its capital at Constantinople, continued as Persia's principal western enemy, and main enemy in general. Hostilities between the two empires became more frequent. The Sasanians, similar to the Roman Empire, were in a constant state of conflict with neighboring kingdoms and nomadic hordes. Although the threat of nomadic incursions could never be fully resolved, the Sasanians generally dealt much more successfully with these matters than did the Romans, due to their policy of making coordinated campaigns against threatening nomads.

The last of the many and frequent wars with the Byzantines, the climactic Byzantine–Sasanian War of 602–628, which included the siege of the Byzantine capital Constantinople, ended with both rivaling sides having drastically exhausted their human and material resources. Furthermore, social conflict within the Empire had considerably weakened it further. Consequently, they were vulnerable to the sudden emergence of the Islamic Rashidun Caliphate, whose forces invaded both empires only a few years after the war. The Muslim forces swiftly conquered the entire Sasanian Empire and in the Byzantine–Arab Wars deprived the Byzantine Empire of its territories in the Levant, the Caucasus, Egypt, and North Africa. Over the following centuries, half the Byzantine Empire and the entire Sasanian Empire came under Muslim rule.

In general, over the span of the centuries, in the west, Sasanian territory abutted that of the large and stable Roman state, but to the east, its nearest neighbors were the Kushan Empire and nomadic tribes such as the White Huns. The construction of fortifications such as Tus citadel or the city of Nishapur, which later became a center of learning and trade, also assisted in defending the eastern provinces from attack.

In south and central Arabia, Bedouin Arab tribes occasionally raided the Sasanian Empire. The Kingdom of Al-Hirah, a Sasanian vassal kingdom, was established to form a buffer zone between the empire's heartland and the Bedouin tribes. The dissolution of the Kingdom of Al-Hirah by Khosrow II in 602 contributed greatly to decisive Sasanian defeats suffered against Bedouin Arabs later in the century. These defeats resulted in a sudden takeover of the Sasanian Empire by Bedouin tribes under the Islamic banner.

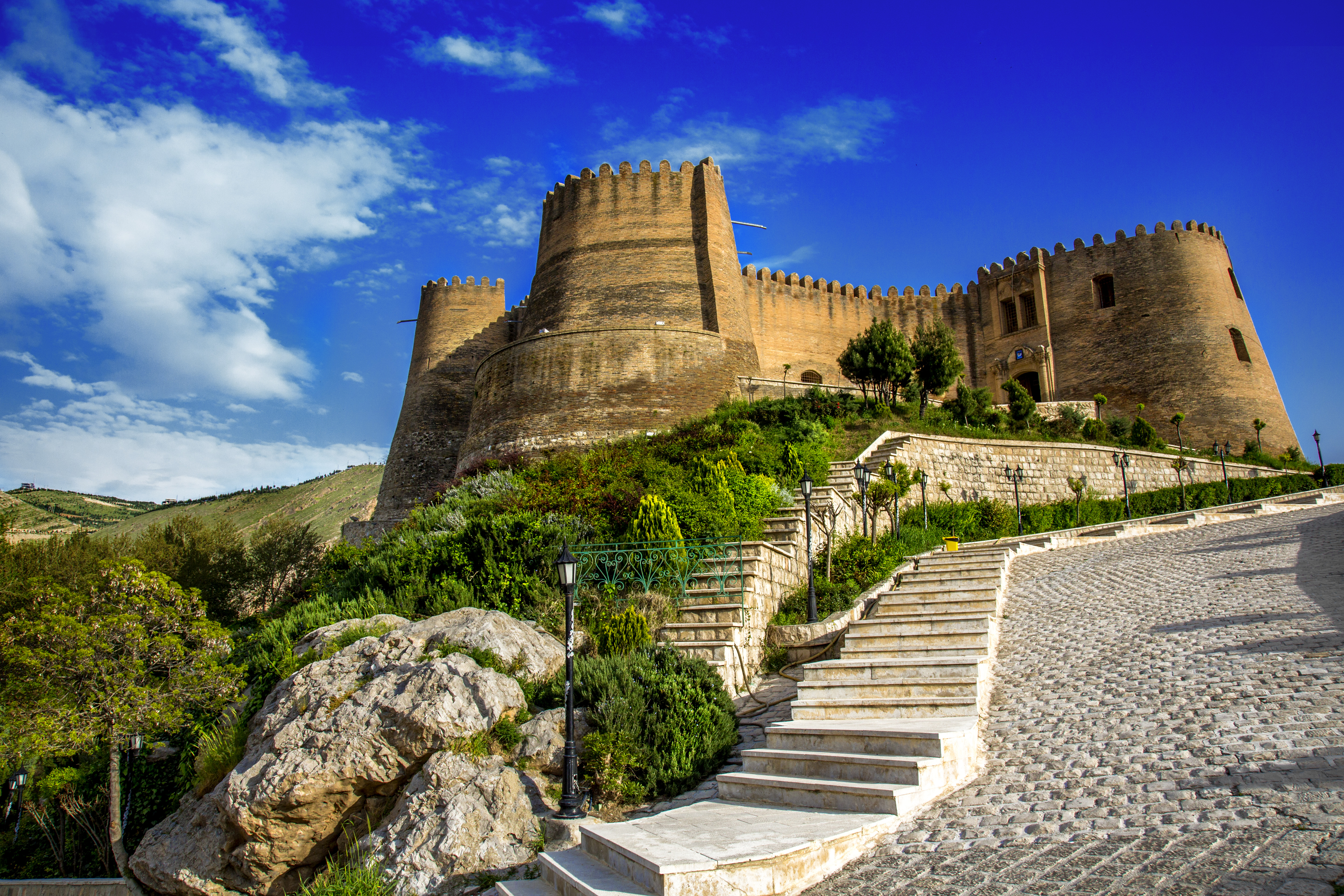
Falak-ol-Aflak in Khorramabad, built in 240–270 AD during the time of Shapur I, the second Sasanian ruler

In the north, Khazars and the Western Turkic Khaganate frequently assaulted the northern provinces of the empire. They plundered Media in 634. Shortly thereafter, the Persian army defeated them and drove them out. The Sasanians built numerous fortifications in the Caucasus region to halt these attacks, such as the imposing fortifications built in Derbent (Dagestan, North Caucasus, now a part of Russia) that to a large extent, have remained intact up to this day.

On the eastern side of the Caspian Sea, the Sasanians erected the Great Wall of Gorgan, a 200 km-long defensive structure probably aimed to protect the empire from northern peoples, such as the White Huns.

=== Kingdom of Aksum ===
In 522, before Khosrow's reign, a group of Monophysite Axumites led an attack on the dominant Himyarites of southern Arabia. The local Arab leader was able to resist the attack but appealed to the Sasanians for aid, while the Axumites subsequently turned towards the Byzantines for help. The Axumites sent another force across the Red Sea and this time successfully killed the Arab leader and replaced him with an Axumite man to be king of the region.

In 531, Emperor Justinian suggested that the Axumites of Yemen should cut out the Persians from Indian trade by maritime trade with the Indians. The Ethiopians never met this request because an Axumite general named Abraha took control of the Yemenite throne and created an independent nation. After Abraha's death one of his sons, Ma'd-Karib, went into exile while his half-brother took the throne. After being denied by Justinian, Ma'd-Karib sought help from Khosrow, who sent a small fleet and army under commander Vahriz to depose the new king of Yemen. After capturing the capital city San'a'l, Ma'd-Karib's son, Saif, was put on the throne.

Justinian was ultimately responsible for Sasanian maritime presence in Yemen. By not providing the Yemenite Arabs support, Khosrow was able to help Ma'd-Karib and subsequently established Yemen as a principality of the Sassanian Empire.

=== Dynasties of China ===
Like their predecessors the Parthians, the Sasanian Empire actively sought foreign relations with China, and ambassadors from Persia frequently travelled to China. Chinese documents mention sixteen Sassanid embassies to China from 455 to 555. Commercially, land and sea trade with China was important to both the Sasanians and the Chinese. Large numbers of Sasanian coins have been found in southern China, confirming the existence of maritime trade.

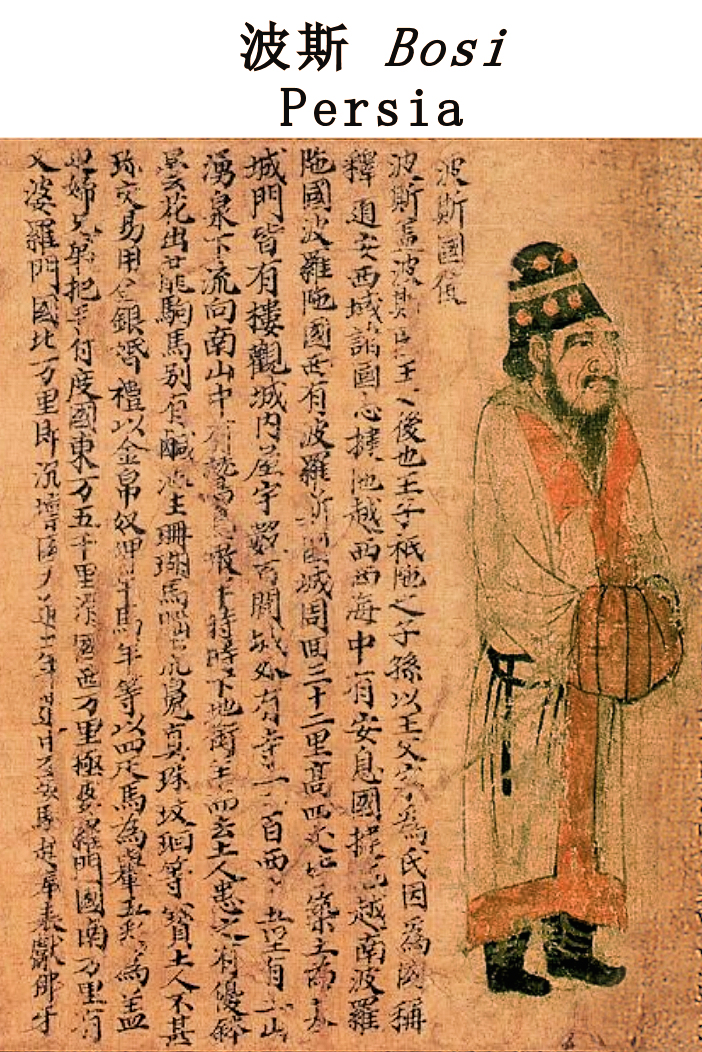
Persian ambassador at the Chinese court of Emperor Yuan of Liang in his capital Jingzhou in 526–539 AD, with explanatory text. Portraits of Periodical Offering of Liang, 11th century Song copy.

On different occasions, Sasanian kings sent their most talented Persian musicians and dancers to the Chinese imperial court at Luoyang during the Jin and Northern Wei dynasties, and to Chang'an during the Sui and Tang dynasties. Both empires benefited from trade along the Silk Road and shared a common interest in preserving and protecting that trade. They cooperated in guarding the trade routes through central Asia, and both built outposts in border areas to keep caravans safe from nomadic tribes and bandits.

Politically, there is evidence that on several occasions the Sasanians and the Chinese formed alliances to counter their common enemy, the Hephthalites. Upon the rise of the nomadic Göktürks in Inner Asia, there seems to have been what looks like an alliance between China and the Sasanians to check the Turkic advances. Documents from Mt. Mogh report the presence of a Chinese general in the service of the king of Sogdiana at the time of the Arab invasions.

Following the invasion of Iran by Muslim Arabs, Peroz III, son of Yazdegerd III, escaped along with a few Persian nobles and took refuge in the Chinese imperial court. Both Peroz and his son Narsieh (Chinese neh-shie) were given high titles at the Chinese court. In 661, Peroz III was appointed Governor of Persia. On at least two occasions, the last possibly in 670, Chinese troops were sent with Peroz in order to restore him to the Sasanian throne. Narsieh later attained the position of a commander of the Chinese imperial guards, and his descendants lived in China as respected princes. Sasanian refugees who fled the Arab conquests settled in China, during the reign of the Chinese emperor Gaozong of Tang.

=== Dynasties of India ===
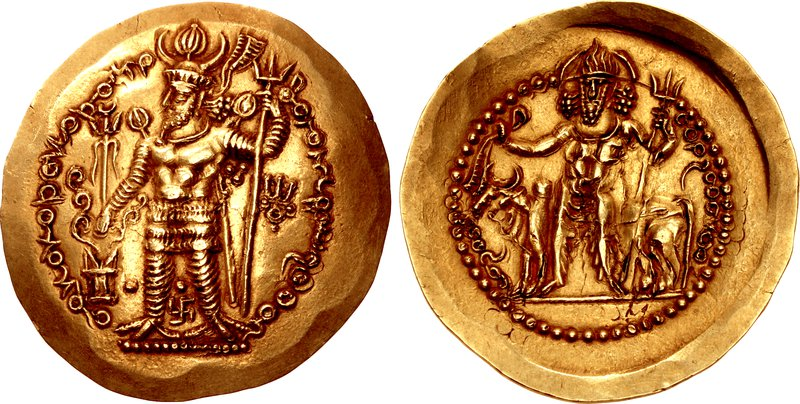
Coin of the Kushanshah Peroz II Kushanshah (r. 303–330)

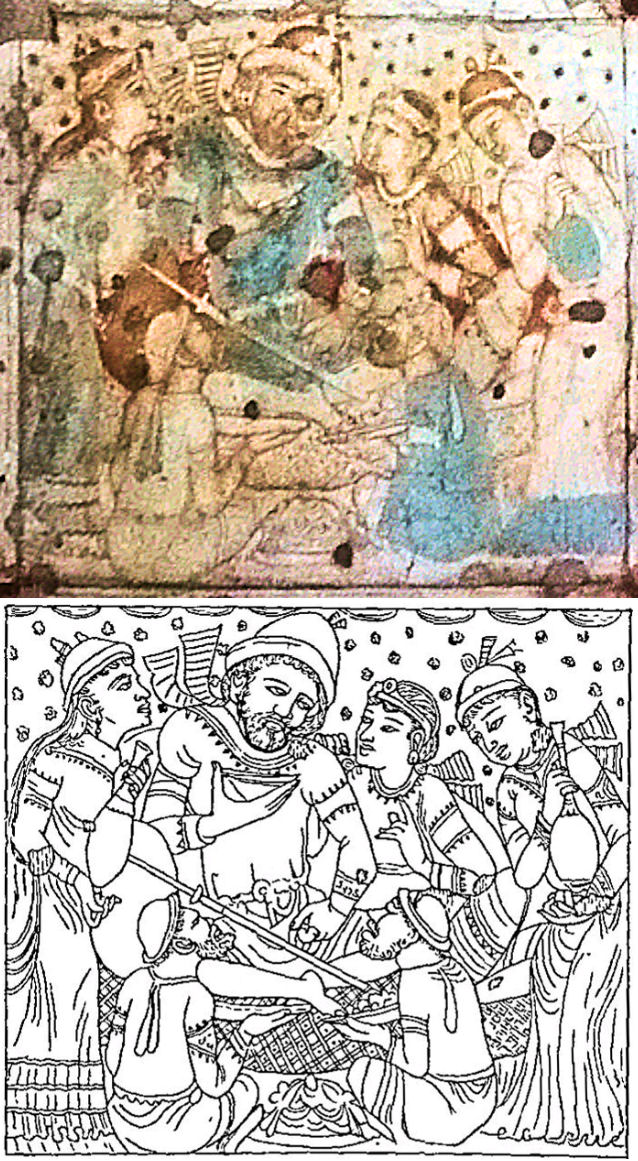
Foreign dignitary drinking wine, on ceiling of Cave 1, at Ajanta Caves, possibly depicting the Sasanian embassy to Indian king Pulakesin II (610–642), photograph and drawing

Following the conquest of Iran and neighboring regions, Shapur I extended his authority northwest of the Indian subcontinent. The previously autonomous Kushans were obliged to accept his suzerainty. These were the western Kushans which controlled Afghanistan while the eastern Kushans were active in India. Although the Kushan empire declined at the end of the 3rd century, to be replaced by the Indian Gupta Empire in the 4th century, it is clear that the Sasanians remained relevant in India's northwest throughout this period.

Persia and northwestern India, the latter that made up formerly part of the Kushans, engaged in cultural as well as political exchange during this period, as certain Sasanian practices spread into the Kushan territories. In particular, the Kushans were influenced by the Sasanian conception of kingship, which spread through the trade of Sasanian silverware and textiles depicting emperors hunting or dispensing justice.

This cultural interchange did not, however, spread Sasanian religious practices or attitudes to the Kushans. Lower-level cultural interchanges also took place between India and Persia during this period. For example, Persians imported the early form of chess, the chaturanga (Middle Persian: chatrang) from India. In exchange, Persians introduced backgammon (Nēw-Ardašēr) to India.

During Khosrow I's reign, many books were brought from India and translated into Middle Persian. Some of these later found their way into the literature of the Islamic world and Arabic literature. A notable example of this was the translation of the Indian Panchatantra by one of Khosrow's ministers, Borzuya. This translation, known as the Kalīlag ud Dimnag, later made its way into the Arabic literature and Europe. The details of Borzuya's legendary journey to India and his daring acquisition of the Panchatantra are written in full detail in Ferdowsi's Shahnameh, which says:

In Indian books, Borzuya read that on a mountain in that land there grows a plant which when sprinkled over the dead revives them. Borzuya asked Khosrau I for permission to travel to India to obtain the plant. After a fruitless search, he was led to an ascetic who revealed the secret of the plant to him: The "plant" was word, the "mountain" learning, and the "dead" the ignorant. He told Borzuya of a book, the remedy of ignorance, called the Kalila, which was kept in a treasure chamber. The king of India gave Borzuya permission to read the Kalila, provided that he did not make a copy of it. Borzuya accepted the condition but each day memorized a chapter of the book. When he returned to his room he would record what he had memorized that day, thus creating a copy of the book, which he sent to Iran. In Iran, Bozorgmehr translated the book into Pahlavi and, at Borzuya's request, named the first chapter after him.

== Society ==
=== Urbanism and nomadism ===
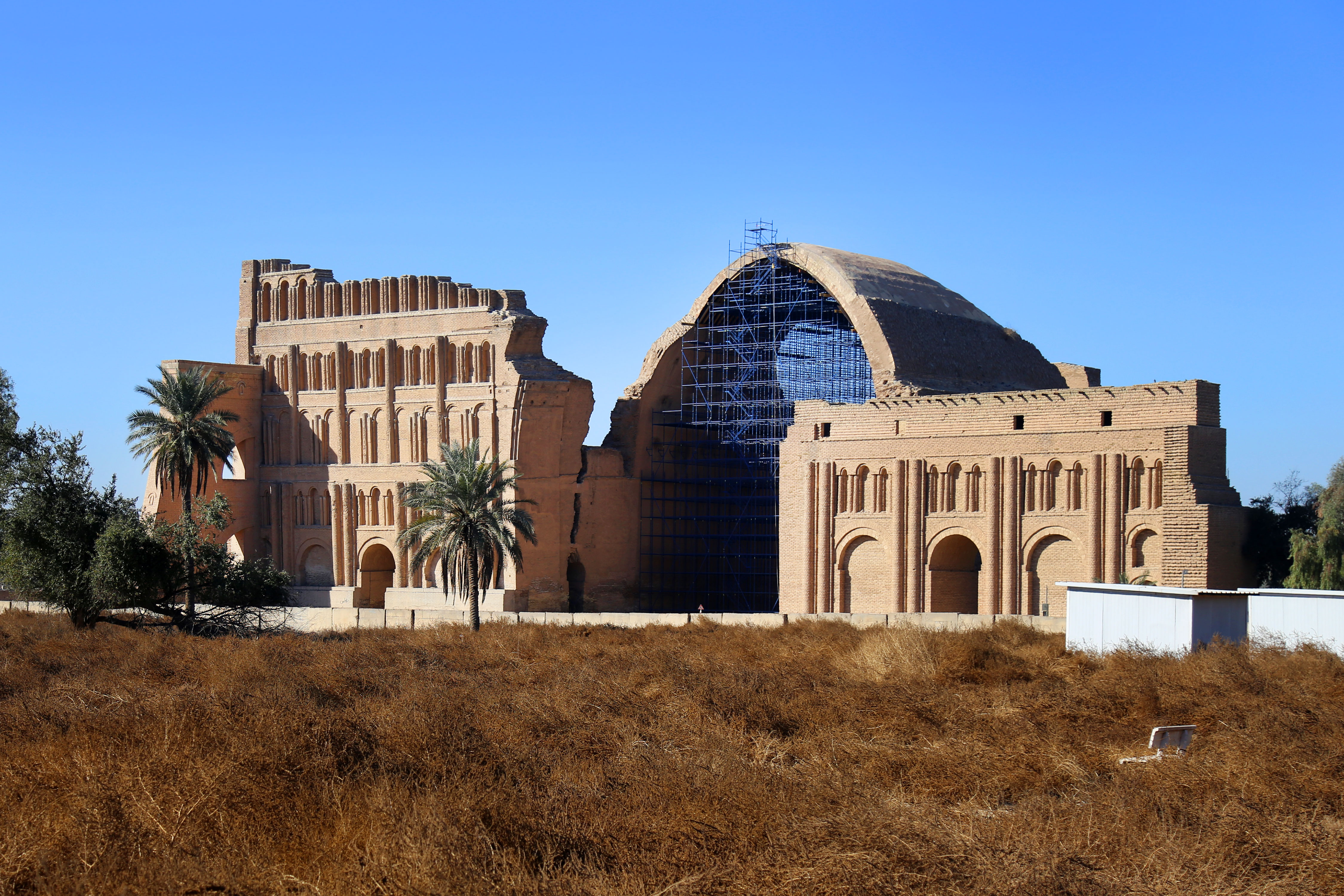
Taq-i Kisra, the facade of the Sasanian palace in the capital Ctesiphon. The city developed into a rich commercial metropolis. It may have been the most populous city of the world in 570–622.

In contrast to Parthian society, the Sasanians renewed emphasis on a charismatic and centralized government. In Sasanian theory, the ideal society could maintain stability and justice, and the necessary instrument for this was a strong monarch. Thus, the Sasanians aimed to be an urban empire, at which they were quite successful. During the late Sasanian period, Mesopotamia had the largest population density in the medieval world. This can be credited to, among other things, the Sasanians founding and re-founding a number of cities, which is talked about in the surviving Middle Persian text Šahrestānīhā ī Ērānšahr (the provincial capitals of Iran). Ardashir I himself built and re-built many cities, which he named after himself, such as Veh-Ardashir in Asoristan, Ardashir-Khwarrah in Pars and Vahman-Ardashir in Meshan. During the Sasanian period, many cities with the name "Iran-khwarrah" were established. This was because Sasanians wanted to revive Avesta ideology.

Many of these cities, both new and old, were populated not only by native ethnic groups, such as the Iranians or Syriacs, but also by the deported Roman prisoners of war, such as Goths, Slavs, Latins, and others. Many of these prisoners were experienced workers, who were used to build things such as cities, bridges, and dams. This allowed the Sasanians to become familiar with Roman technology. The impact these foreigners made on the economy was significant, as many of them were Christians, and the spread of the religion accelerated throughout the empire.

Unlike the amount of information about the settled people of the Sasanian Empire, there is little about the nomadic/unsettled ones. It is known that they were called "Kurds" by the Sasanians, and that they regularly served the Sasanian military, particularly the Dailamite and Gilani nomads. This way of handling the nomads continued into the Islamic period, where the service of the Dailamites and Gilanis continued unabated.

=== Shahanshah ===
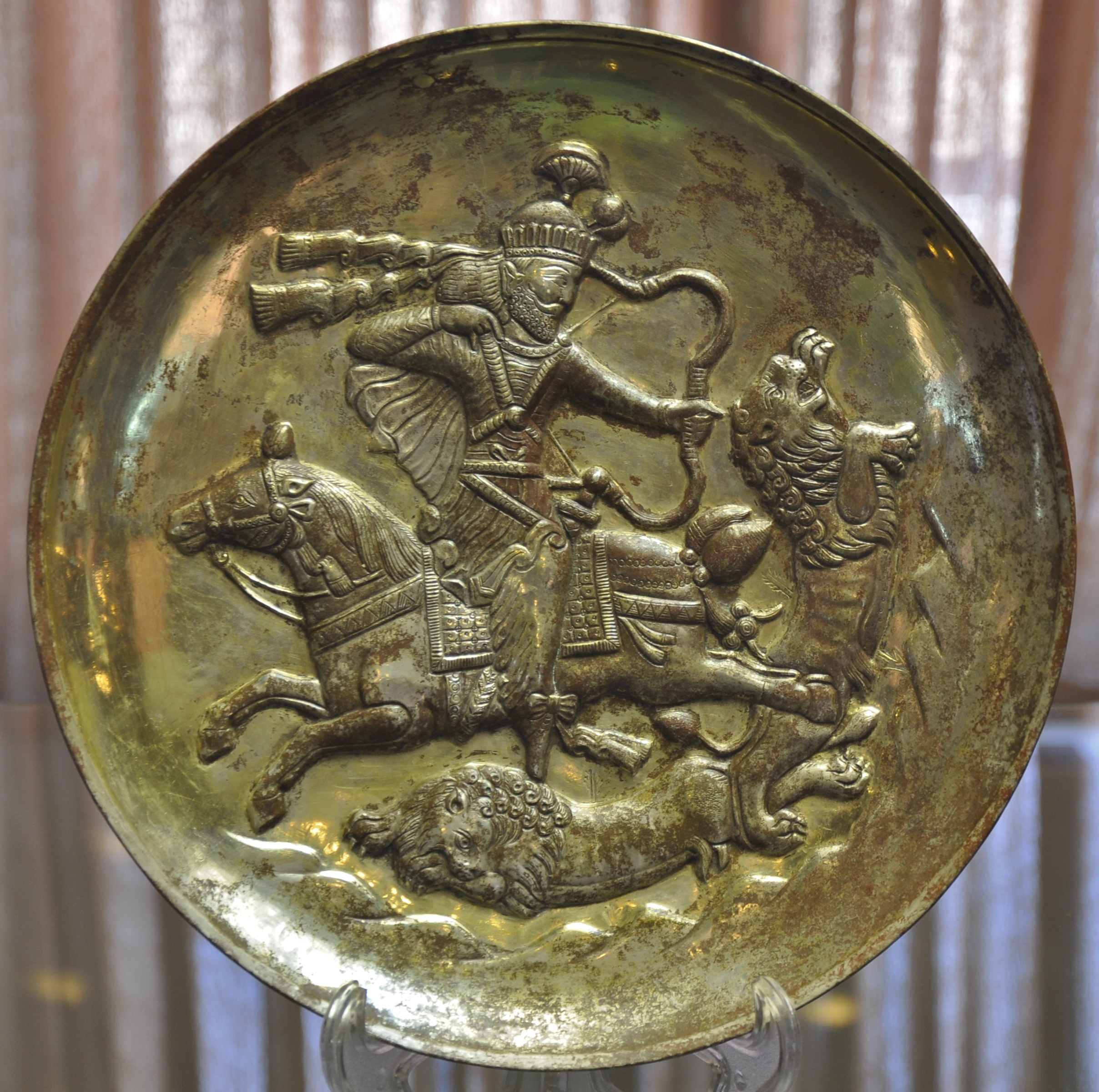
Plate of a Sasanian king, located in the Azerbaijan Museum in Iran

The head of the Sasanian Empire was the shahanshah (king of kings), also simply known as the shah (king). His health and welfare was of high importance—accordingly, the phrase "May you be immortal" was used to reply to him. The Sasanian coins which appeared from the 6th-century and afterwards depict a moon and sun, which, in the words of the Iranian historian Touraj Daryaee, "suggest that the king was at the center of the world and the sun and moon revolved around him." In effect he was the "king of the four corners of the world", which was an old Mesopotamian idea. The king saw all other rulers, such as the Romans, Turks, and Chinese, as being beneath him. The king wore colorful clothes, makeup, a heavy crown, while his beard was decorated with gold. The early Sasanian kings considered themselves of divine descent; they called themselves "bay" (divine).

When the king went out in public, he was hidden behind a curtain, and had some of his men in front of him, whose duty was to keep the masses away from him and to clear the way. When one came to the king, one was expected to prostrate oneself before him, also known as proskynesis. The king's guards were known as the pushtigban. On other occasions, the king was protected by a discrete group of palace guards, known as the darigan. Both of these groups were enlisted from royal families of the Sasanian Empire, and were under the command of the hazarbed, who was in charge of the king's safety, controlled the entrance of the kings palace, presented visitors to the king, and was allowed military commands or used as a negotiator. The hazarbed was also allowed in some cases to serve as the royal executioner. During Nowruz (Iranian new year) and Mihragan (Mihr's day), the king would hold a speech.

=== Class division ===
Sasanian society was immensely complex, with separate systems of social organization governing numerous different groups within the empire. Historians believe society comprised four social classes: (Note: These four are the three common Indo-European social tripartition common among ancient Iranian, Indian and Romans with one extra Iranian element (from Yashna xix/17).)

1. Asronan (priests)
2. Arteshtaran (warriors)
3. Wastaryoshan (commoners)
4. Hutukhshan (artisans)

At the center of the Sasanian caste system the shahanshah ruled over all the nobles. The royal princes, petty rulers, great landlords and priests, together constituted a privileged stratum, and were identified as wuzurgan, or grandees. This social system appears to have been fairly rigid.

This social system was strictly stratified with virtually no social mobility. State and religious laws explicitly forbade intermarriage and movement between classes. The lower classes (Wastaryoshan and Hutukhshan) bore the overwhelming majority of the state's tax burden. Furthermore, formal education was legally monopolized by the nobility and priesthood, while commoners were intentionally barred from education to ensure they remained in their inherited caste-ordained professions.

The Sasanian caste system outlived the empire, continuing in the early Islamic period. The Sasanian caste system was directly based on Zoroastrian doctrine.

=== Slavery ===
In general, mass slavery was never practiced by the Iranians, and in many cases the situation and lives of semi-slaves (prisoners of war) were, in fact, better than those of the commoner. (Note: "Persians never practiced mass slavery, and in many cases the situations and lives of semi-slaves (prisoners of war) were in fact better than the common citizens of Persia.") In Persia, the term "slave" was also used for debtors who had to use some of their time to serve in a fire-temple.

Some of the laws governing the ownership and treatment of slaves can be found in the legal compilation called the Mādayān ī Hazār Dādestān, a collection of rulings by Sasanian judges. Principles that can be inferred from the laws include:

- Sources of slaves were both foreign (e.g., non-Zoroastrians captives from warfare or raiding or slaves imported from outside the Empire by traders) or domestic (e.g., hereditary slaves, children sold into slavery by their fathers, or criminals enslaved as punishment). Some cases suggest that a criminal's family might also be condemned to servitude. At the time of the manuscript's composition, Iranian slavery was hereditary on the mother's side (so that a child of a free man and a slave woman would be a slave), although the author reports that in earlier Persian history it may have been the opposite, being inherited from the father's side.
- Slave owners had the right to the slaves' income.
- While slaves were formally chattel (property) and were liable to the same legal treatment as nonhuman property (for example, they could be sold at will, rented, owned jointly, inherited, given as security for a loan, etc.), Sasanian courts did not treat them completely as objects; for example, slaves were allowed to testify in court in cases concerning them, rather than only permitted to be represented by their owners.
- Slaves were often given to the Zoroastrian fire temples as a pious offering, in which case they and their descendants would become temple-slaves.
- Excessive cruelty towards slaves could result in the owners' being brought to court; a court case involving a slave whose owner tried to drown him in the Tigris River is recorded, though without stating the outcome of the case.
- If a non-Zoroastrian slave, such as a Christian slave, converted to Zoroastrianism, he or she could pay their price and attain freedom; i.e., as long as the owner was compensated, manumission was required.
- Owners could also voluntarily manumit their slaves, in which case the former slave became a subject of the Sasanian King of Kings and could not lawfully be re-enslaved later. Manumissions were recorded, which suggests that a freedman who was challenged would be able to document their free status.
- Uniquely in comparison to Western slave systems, Sasanian slavery recognized partial manumission (relevant in the case of a jointly owned slave, only some of whose owners were willing to manumit). In case of a slave who was, e.g., one-half manumitted, the slave would serve in alternating years.

To free a slave (irrespective of their faith) was considered a good deed. Slaves had some rights including keeping gifts from the owner and at least three days of rest in the month.

The most common slaves in the Sasanian Empire were the household servants, who worked in private estates and at the fire-temples. Usage of a woman slave in a home was common, and her master had outright control over her and could even produce children with her if he wanted to. Slaves also received wages and were able to have their own families whether they were female or male. Harming a slave was considered a crime, and not even the king himself was allowed to do it.

The master of a slave was allowed to free the person whenever he wanted to. A slave could also be freed at the death of his/her master.

== Culture ==
=== Education ===
There was a major school, called the Grand School, in the capital. In the beginning, only 50 students were allowed to study at the Grand School. In less than 100 years, enrollment at the Grand School was over 30,000 students.

=== Society ===
On a lower level, Sasanian society was divided into Azatan (freemen). The Azatan formed a large low-aristocracy of low-level administrators, mostly living on small estates. The Azatan provided the cavalry backbone of the Sasanian army.

=== Arts, science, and literature ===
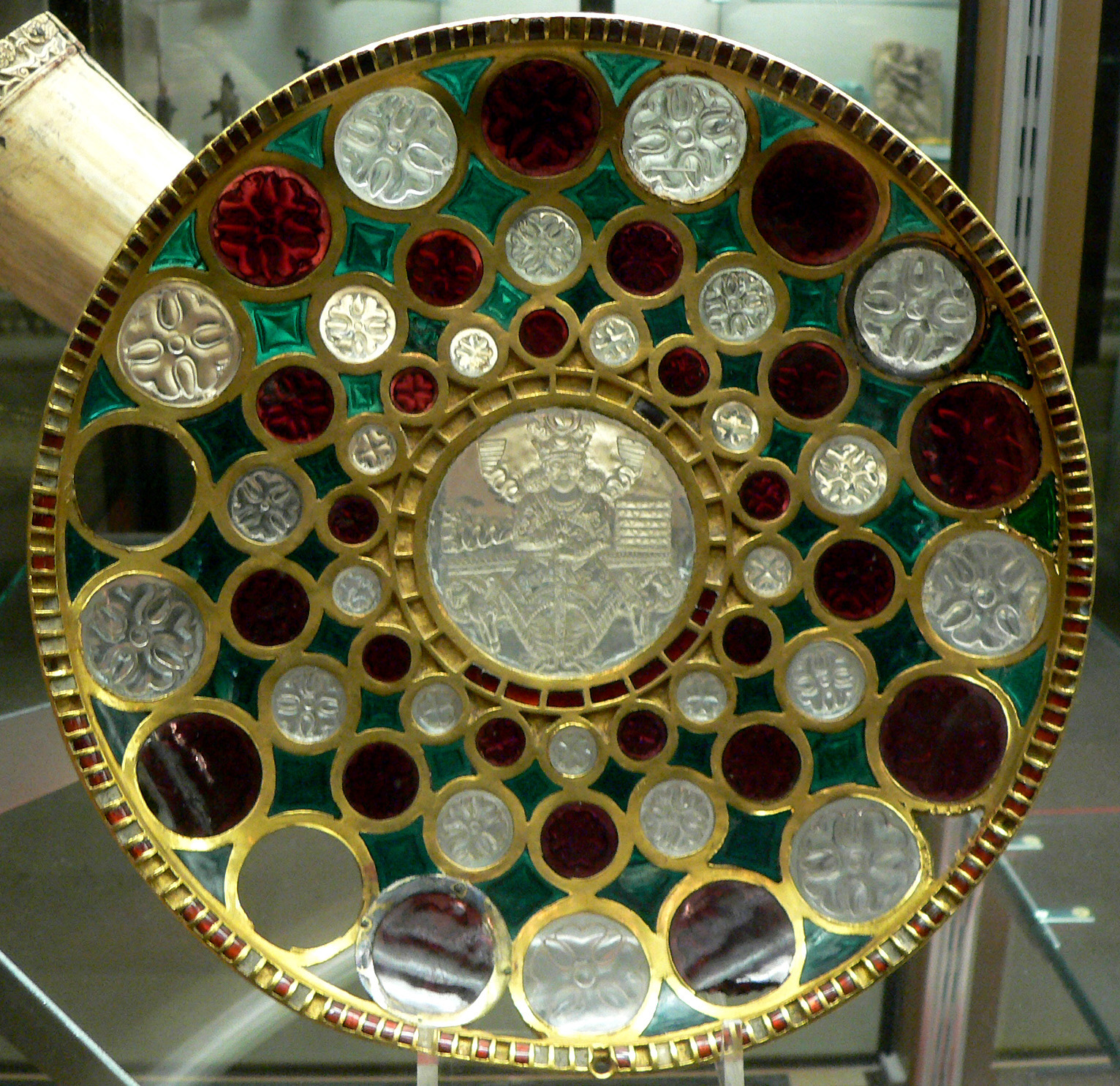
A bowl with Khosrow I's image at the center

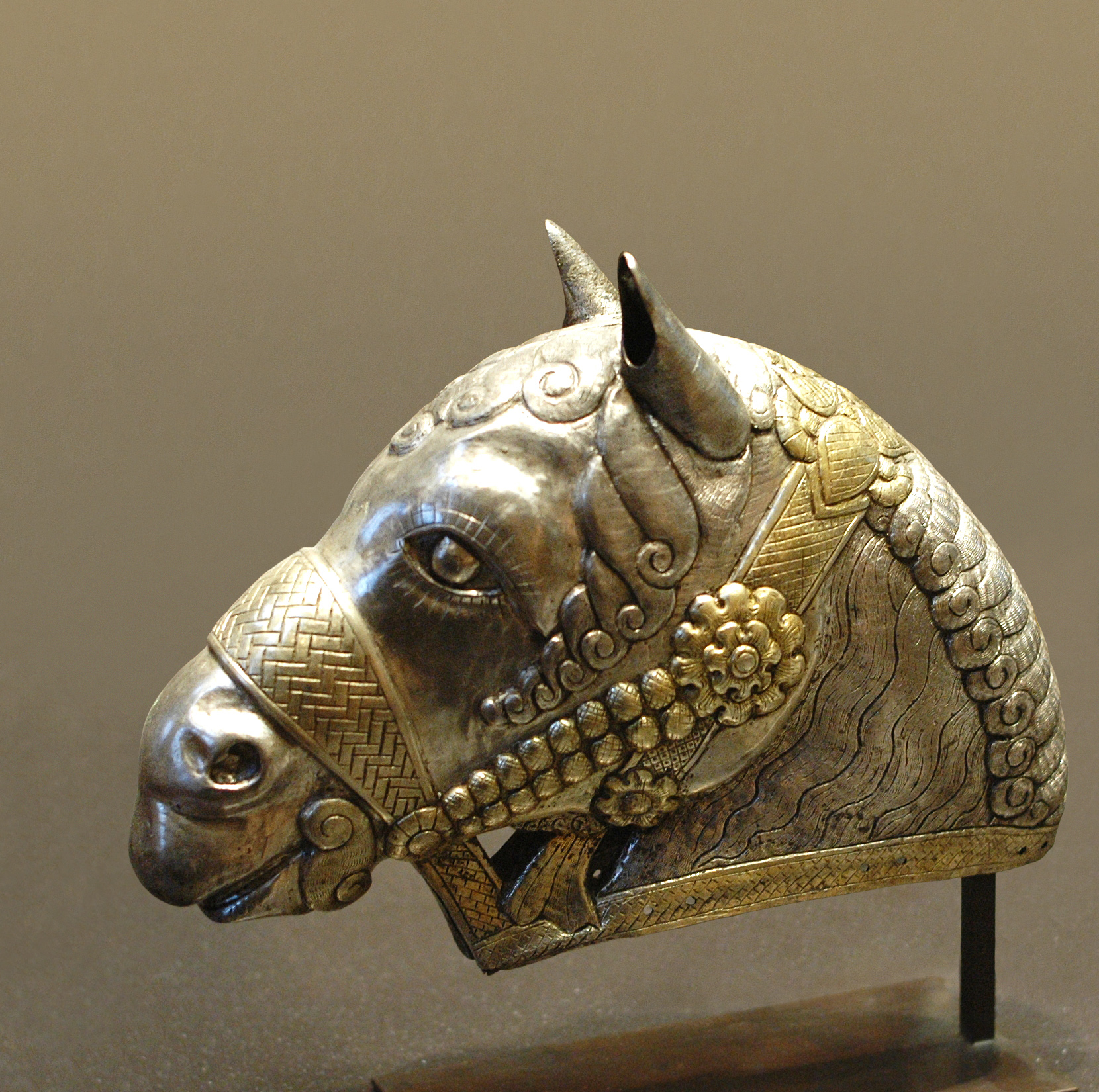
Horse head, gilded silver, 4th century, Sasanian art

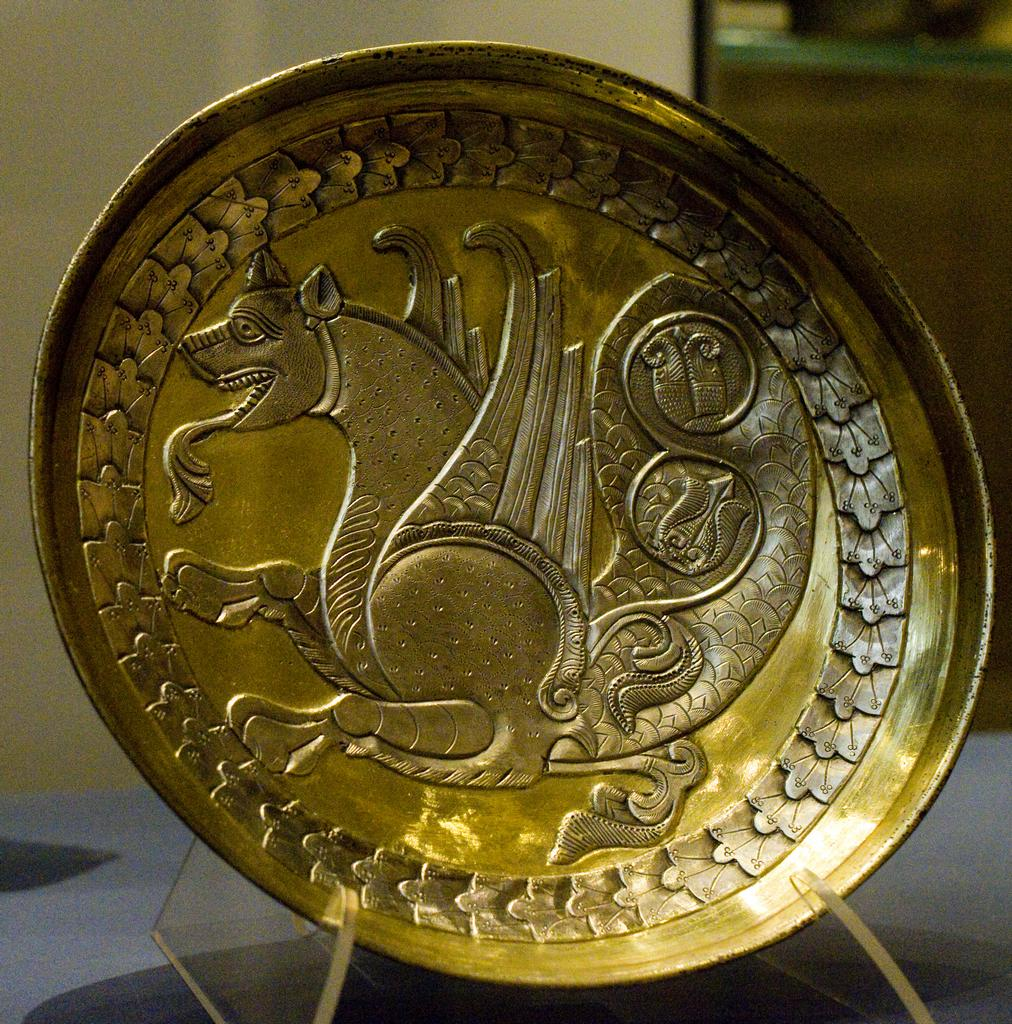
A Sasanian silver plate featuring a simurgh. The mythical bird was used as the royal emblem in the Sasanian period.

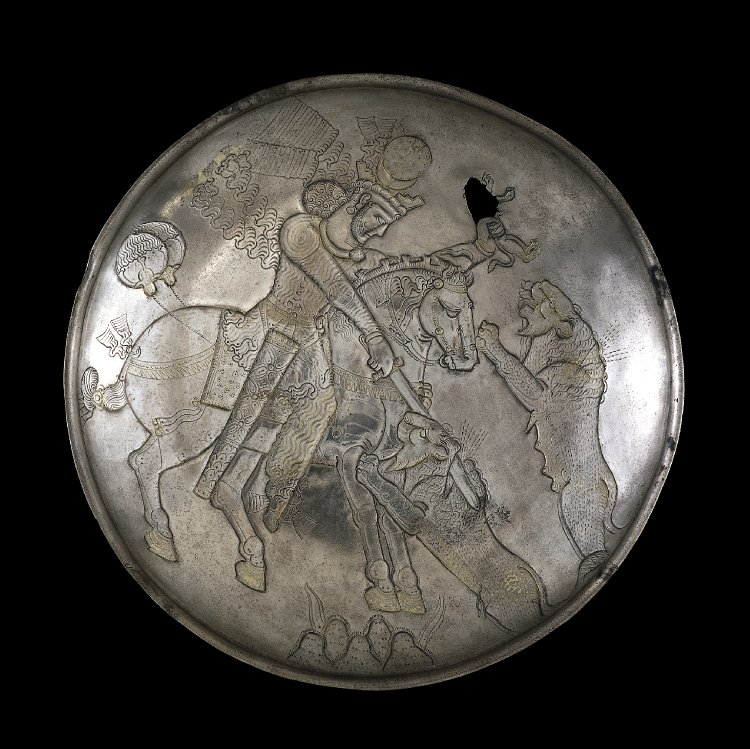
A Sasanian silver plate depicting a royal lion hunt

The Sasanian kings were patrons of letters and philosophy. Khosrow I had the works of Plato and Aristotle, translated into Pahlavi, taught at Gundishapur, and read them himself. During his reign, many historical annals were compiled, of which the sole survivor is the Karnamak-i Artaxshir-i Papakan (Deeds of Ardashir), a mixture of history and romance that served as the basis of the Iranian national epic, the Shahnameh. When Justinian I closed the schools of Athens, seven of their professors went to Persia and found refuge at Khosrow's court. In his treaty of 533 with Justinian, the Sasanian king stipulated that the Greek sages should be allowed to return and be free from persecution.

Under Khosrow I, the Academy of Gundishapur, which had been founded in the 5th century, became "the greatest intellectual center of the time", drawing students and teachers from every quarter of the known world. Nestorian Christians were received there, and brought Syriac translations of Greek works in medicine and philosophy. The medical lore of India, Persia, Syria, and Greece mingled there to produce a flourishing school of therapy.

The Sasanian period saw an open exchange of ideas with other people, in particular with India and Byzantium. From India, works on medicine, astronomy, mirrors for princes and fables such as the panchatantra were imported and translated. Indian works on astrology were especially prized and much effort was dedicated to their translation. Chess was also imported from India, where it was adopted and underwent further development. From Byzantium came musical instruments, scientific, medical, and philosophical works. The decision of emperor Justinian to close down the neo-platonic school in Athens caused many philosophers to travel to Persia and seek work at the academy of Gondishapur.

Artistically, the Sasanian period witnessed some of the highest achievements of Iranian civilization. Much of what would later become known as Islamic culture, including architecture and writing, was originally drawn from Persian culture. At its peak, the Sasanian Empire stretched from western Anatolia to northwest India (today Pakistan), but its influence was felt far beyond these political boundaries. Sasanian motifs found their way into the art of Central Asia and China, the Byzantine Empire, and even Merovingian France. Islamic art however, was the true heir to Sasanian art, whose concepts it was to assimilate while at the same time instilling fresh life and renewed vigor into it. According to Will Durant:

Sasanian art exported its forms and motifs eastward into India, Turkestan and China, westward into Syria, Asia Minor, Constantinople, the Balkans, Egypt and Spain. Probably its influence helped to change the emphasis in Greek art from classic representation to Byzantine ornament, and in Latin Christian art from wooden ceilings to brick or stone vaults and domes and buttressed walls.

Sasanian carvings at Taq-e Bostan and Naqsh-e Rustam were colored; so were many features of the palaces; but only traces of such painting remain. The literature, however, makes it clear that the art of painting flourished in Sasanian times. Painting, sculpture, pottery, and other forms of decoration shared their designs with Sasanian textile art. Silks, embroideries, brocades, damasks, tapestries, chair covers, canopies, tents, and rugs were woven with patience and masterly skill, and were dyed in warm tints of yellow, blue and green. Great colorful carpets had been an appendage of wealth in the East since Assyrian days. The two dozen Sasanian textiles that have survived are among the most highly valued fabrics in existence. Even in their own day, Sasanian textiles were admired and imitated from Egypt to the Far East; and during the Middle Ages, they were favored for clothing the relics of Christian saints.

Studies on Sasanian remains show over 100 types of crowns being worn by Sasanian kings. The various Sasanian crowns demonstrate the cultural, economic, social and historical situation in each period. The crowns also show the character traits of each king in this era. Different symbols and signs on the crowns—the moon, stars, eagle and palm, each illustrate the wearer's religious faith and beliefs.

The Sasanian dynasty, like the Achaemenid, originated in the province of Pars. The Sasanians saw themselves as successors of the Achaemenids, after the Hellenistic and Parthian interlude, and believed that it was their destiny to restore the greatness of Persia.

When reviving the glories of the Achaemenid past, the Sasanians went beyond imitation. The art of this period reveals an astonishing virility, in certain respects anticipating key features of Islamic art. Sasanian art combined elements of traditional Persian art with Hellenistic elements and influences. The conquest of Persia by Alexander the Great helped introduce Hellenistic art to the East. Though the East accepted the outward form of this art, it never really assimilated its spirit. By the Parthian period, Hellenistic art was being interpreted freely by the peoples of the Near East, and during the Sasanian period, there was reaction against it. Sasanian art revived forms and traditions native to Persia, and in the Islamic period, these reached the shores of the Mediterranean. According to Fergusson:

"With the accession of the [Sasanians], Persia regained much of that power and stability to which she had been so long a stranger ... The improvement in the fine arts at home indicates returning prosperity, and a degree of security unknown since the fall of the Achaemenidae."

Surviving palaces illustrate the splendor in which the Sasanian monarchs lived. Examples include palaces at Firuzabad and Bishapur in pars, and the capital city of Ctesiphon in the Asoristan province (present-day Iraq). In addition to local traditions, Parthian architecture influenced Sasanian architectural characteristics. All are characterized by the barrel-vaulted iwans introduced in the Parthian period. During the Sasanian period, these reached massive proportions, particularly at Ctesiphon. There, the arch of the great vaulted hall, attributed to the reign of Shapur I (241–272), has a span of more than 80 feet (24 m) and reaches a height of 118 feet (36 m). This magnificent structure fascinated architects in the centuries that followed and has been considered one of the most important examples of Persian architecture. Many of the palaces contain an inner audience hall consisting, as at Firuzabad, of a chamber surmounted by a dome. The Persians solved the problem of constructing a circular dome on a square building by employing squinches, or arches built across each corner of the square, thereby converting it into an octagon on which it is simple to place the dome. The dome chamber in the palace of Firuzabad is the earliest surviving example of the use of the squinch, suggesting that this architectural technique was probably invented in Persia.

Among the unique characteristics of Sasanian architecture was its distinctive use of space. The Sasanian architect conceived his building in terms of masses and surfaces; hence the use of massive walls of brick decorated with molded or carved stucco. Stucco wall decorations appear at Bishapur, but better examples are preserved at Chal Tarkhan near Rey, which date to the late Sasanian or early Islamic period, and from Ctesiphon and Kish in Mesopotamia. The panels show animal figures set in roundels, human busts, and geometric and floral motifs.

== Economy ==
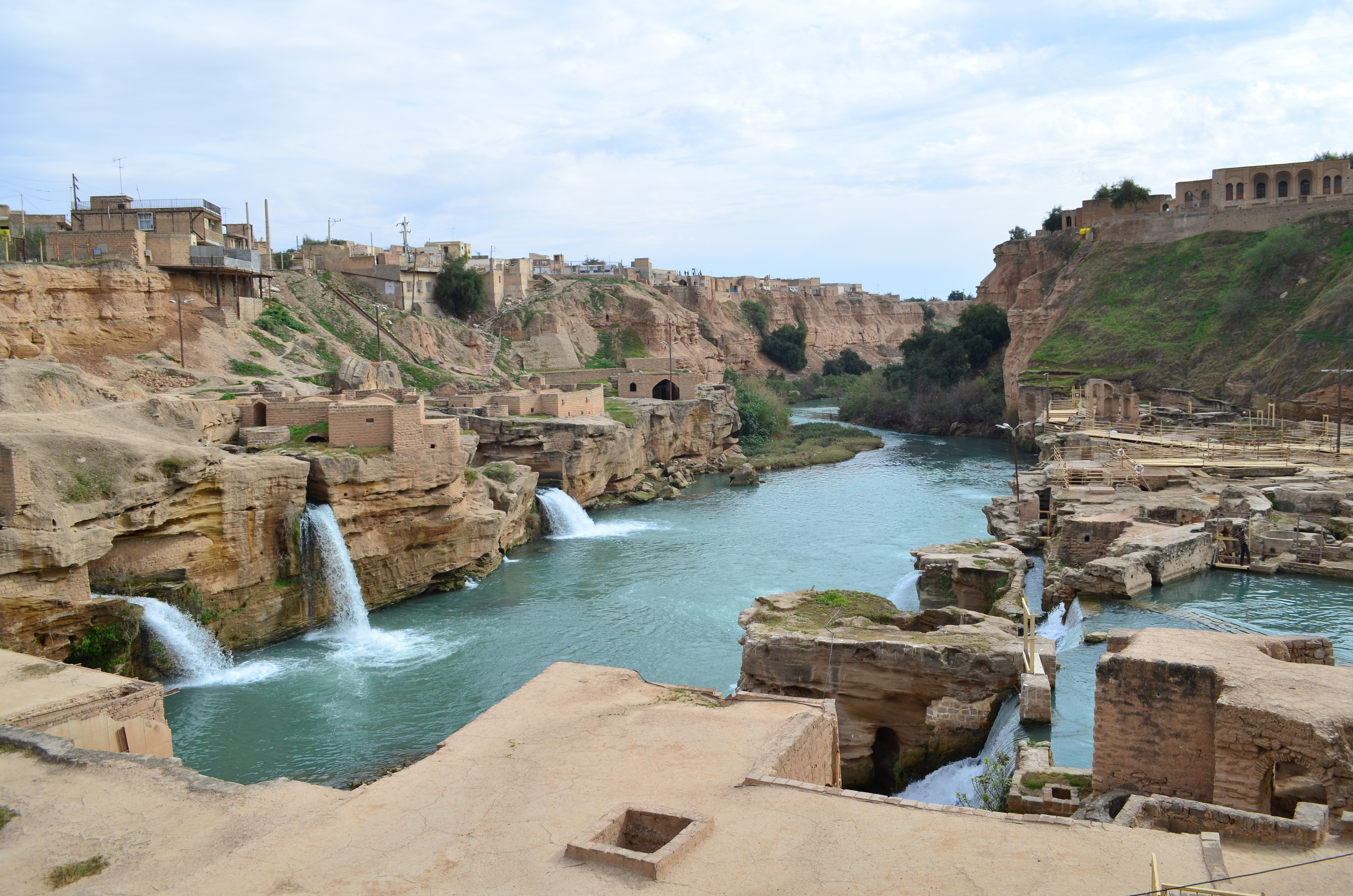
The remains of the Shushtar Historical Hydraulic System, a UNESCO World Heritage Site

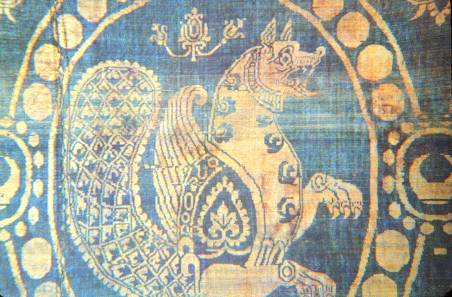
Sasanian silk twill textile of a simurgh in a beaded surround, 6th–7th century. Used in the reliquary of Saint Len, Paris.

Due to the majority of the inhabitants being of peasant stock, the Sasanian economy relied on farming and agriculture, Khuzestan and Iraq being the most important provinces for it. The Nahrawan Canal is one of the greatest examples of Sasanian irrigation systems, and many of these things can still be found in Iran. The mountains of the Sasanian state were used for lumbering by the nomads of the region, and the centralized nature of the Sasanian state allowed it to impose taxes on the nomads and inhabitants of the mountains. During the reign of Khosrow I, further land was brought under centralized administration.

Two trade routes were used during the Sasanian period: one in the north, the famous Silk Route, and one less prominent route on the southern Sasanian coast. The factories of Susa, Gundeshapur, and Shushtar were famously known for their production of silk, and rivaled the Chinese factories. The Sasanians showed great toleration to the inhabitants of the countryside, which allowed the latter to stockpile in case of famine.

=== Industry and trade ===
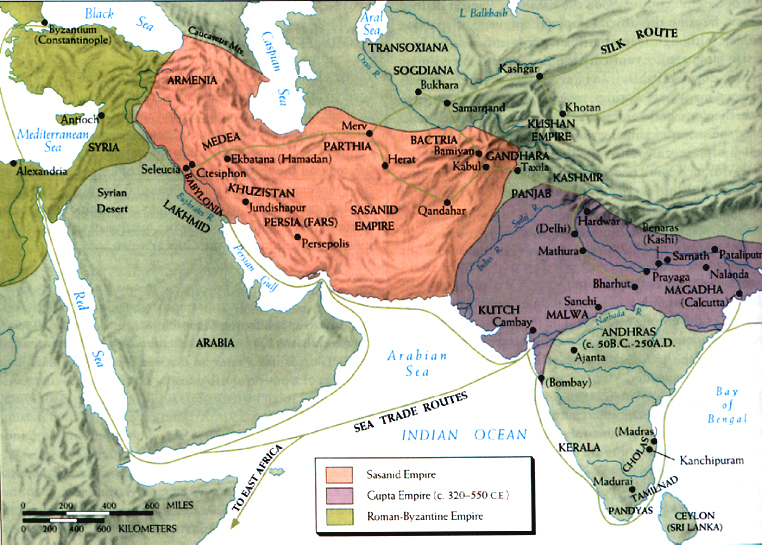
Sasanian sea trade routes

Persian industry under the Sasanians developed from domestic to urban forms. Guilds were numerous. Good roads and bridges, well patrolled, enabled state post and merchant caravans to link Ctesiphon with all provinces; and harbors were built in the Persian Gulf to quicken trade with India. Sasanian merchants ranged far and wide and gradually ousted Romans from the lucrative Indian Ocean trade routes. Recent archeological discovery has shown the interesting fact that Sasanians used special labels (commercial labels) on goods as a way of promoting their brands and distinguish between different qualities.

Khosrow I further extended the already vast trade network. The Sasanian state now tended toward monopolistic control of trade, with luxury goods assuming a far greater role in the trade than heretofore, and the great activity in building of ports, caravanserais, bridges and the like, was linked to trade and urbanization. The Persians dominated international trade, both in the Indian Ocean, Central Asia and South Russia, in the time of Khosrow, although competition with the Byzantines was at times intense. Sassanian settlements in Oman and Yemen testify to the importance of trade with India, but the silk trade with China was mainly in the hands of Sasanian vassals and the Iranian people, the Sogdians. In 571 direct control over incense produced in Yemen, fell to the Sasanian Empire.

The main exports of the Sasanians were silk; woolen and golden textiles; carpets and rugs; hides; and leather and pearls from the Persian Gulf. There were also goods in transit from China (paper, silk) and India (spices), which Sasanian customs imposed taxes upon, and which were re-exported from the Empire to Europe.

It was also a time of increased metallurgical production, so Iran earned a reputation as the "armory of Asia". Most of the Sasanian mining centers were at the fringes of the Empire – in Armenia, the Caucasus and above all, Transoxania. The extraordinary mineral wealth of the Pamir Mountains led to a legend among the Tajiks: when God was creating the world, he tripped over the Pamirs, dropping his jar of minerals, which spread across the region.

== Religion ==
=== Zoroastrianism ===
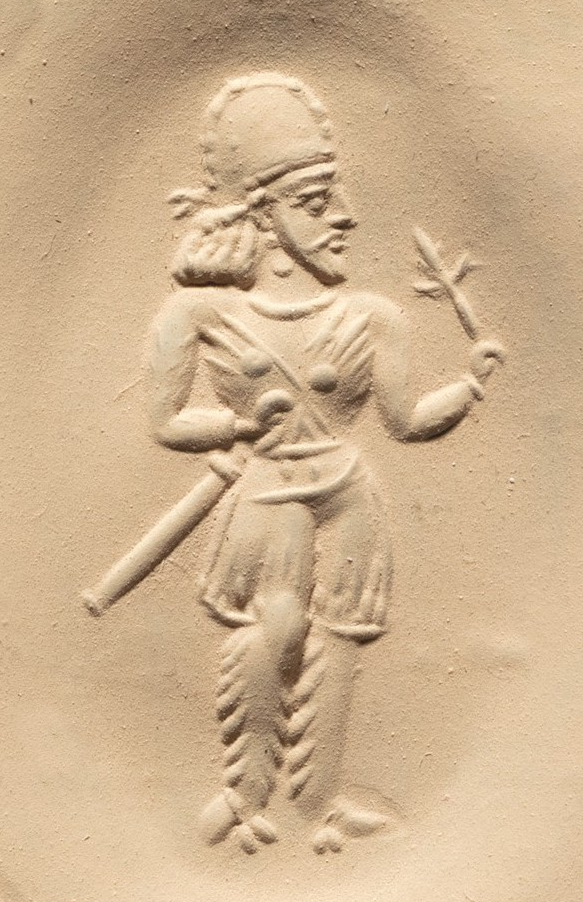
Seal of a Sassanian nobleman holding a flower, c. 3rd–early 4th century AD

Under Parthian rule, Zoroastrianism had fragmented into regional variations which also saw the rise of local cult-deities, some from Iranian religious tradition but others drawn from Greek tradition too. Greek paganism and religious ideas had spread and mixed with Zoroastrianism when Alexander the Great had conquered the Persian Empire from Darius III—a process of Greco-Persian religious and cultural synthesisation which had continued into the Parthian era. However, under the Sasanians, an orthodox Zoroastrianism was revived and the religion would undergo numerous and important developments.

Sasanian Zoroastrianism developed clear distinctions from the practices laid out in the Avesta, the holy books of Zoroastrianism. Sasanian religious policies contributed to the flourishing of numerous religious reform movements, most importantly those founded by the religious leaders Mani and Mazdak.

The relationship between the Sasanian kings and the religions practiced in their empire became complex and varied. For instance, while Shapur I tolerated some religions and was a Zurvanite himself, religious minorities at times were suppressed under later kings, such as under Bahram II. Shapur II, on the other hand, heavily persecuted Christians, especially doing so in the wake of Constantine's conversion.

Zurvanism is theorized to have been the official state religion of the Sasanians.

==== Tansar and his justification for Ardashir I's rebellion ====
From the very beginning of Sasanian rule in 224, an orthodox Pars-oriented Zoroastrian tradition would play an important part in influencing and lending legitimization to the state until its collapse in the mid-7th century. After Ardashir I had deposed the last Parthian King (Shah), Artabanus IV, he sought the aid of Tansar, a herbad (high priest) of the Iranian Zoroastrians to aid him in acquiring legitimization for the new dynasty. This Tansar did by writing to the nominal and vassal kings in different regions of Iran to accept Ardashir I as their new King, most notably in the Letter of Tansar, which was addressed to Gushnasp, the vassal king of Tabarestan. Gushnasp had accused Ardashir I of having forsaken tradition by usurping the throne, and that while his actions "may have been good for the World" they were "bad for the faith". Tansar refuted these charges in his letter to Gushnasp by proclaiming that not all of the old ways had been good, and that Ardashir was more virtuous than his predecessors. The Letter of Tansar included some attacks on the religious practices and orientation of the Parthians, who did not follow an orthodox Zoroastrian tradition but rather a heterodox one, and so attempted to justify Ardashir's rebellion against them by arguing that Zoroastrianism had 'decayed' after Alexander's invasion, a decay which had continued under the Parthians and so needed to be 'restored'.

Tansar would later help to oversee the formation of a single 'Zoroastrian church' under the control of the Persian magi, alongside the establishment of a single set of Avestan texts, which he himself approved and authorised.

==== Influence of Kartir ====
Kartir, a very powerful and influential Persian cleric, served under several Sasanian Kings and actively campaigned for the establishment of a Pars-centred Zoroastrian orthodoxy across the Sasanian Empire. His power and influence grew so much that he became the only 'commoner' to later be allowed to have his own rock inscriptions carved in the royal fashion (at Sar Mashhad, Naqsh-e Rostam, Ka'ba-ye Zartosht and Naqsh-e Rajab). Under Shapur I, Kartir was made the 'absolute authority' over the 'order of priests' at the Sassanid court and throughout the empire's regions too, with the implication that all regional Zoroastrian clergies would now for the first time be subordinated to the Persian Zoroastrian clerics of Pars. To some extent Kartir was an iconoclast and took it upon himself to help establish numerous Bahram fires throughout Iran in the place of the 'bagins / ayazans' (monuments and temples containing images and idols of cult-deities) that had proliferated during the Parthian era. In expressing his doctrinal orthodoxy, Kartir also encouraged an obscure Zoroastrian concept known as khvedodah among the common-folk (marriage within the family; between siblings, cousins). At various stages during his long career at court, Kartir also oversaw the periodic persecution of the non-Zoroastrians in Iran, and secured the execution of the prophet Mani during the reign of Bahram I. During the reign of Hormizd I (the predecessor and brother of Bahram I) Kartir was awarded the new Zoroastrian title of mobad—a clerical title that was to be considered higher than that of the eastern-Iranian (Parthian) title of herbad.

==== Calendar reforms ====
The Persians had long known of the Egyptian calendar, with its 365 days divided into 12 months. However, the traditional Zoroastrian calendar had 12 months of 30 days each. During the reign of Ardashir I, an effort was made to introduce a more accurate Zoroastrian calendar for the year, so 5 extra epagomenal days were added to it. These 5 epagomenal days were named the Gatha days and had a practical as well as religious use. However, they were still kept apart from the 'religious year', so as not to disturb the long-held observances of the older Zoroastrian calendar.

Some difficulties arose with the introduction of the first calendar reform, particularly the pushing forward of important Zoroastrian festivals such as Hamaspat-maedaya and Nowruz on the calendar year by year. This confusion apparently caused much distress among ordinary people, and while the Sasanians tried to enforce the observance of these great celebrations on the new official dates, much of the populace continued to observe them on the older, traditional dates, and so parallel celebrations for Nowruz and other Zoroastrian celebrations would often occur within days of each other, in defiance of the new official calendar dates, causing much confusion and friction between the laity and the ruling class. A compromise on this by the Sasanians was later introduced, by linking the parallel celebrations as a 6-day celebration/feast. This was done for all except Nowruz.

A further problem occurred as Nowruz had shifted in position during this period from the spring equinox to autumn, although this inconsistency with the original spring-equinox date for Nowruz had possibly occurred during the Parthian period too.

Further calendar reforms occurred during the later Sasanian era. Ever since the reforms under Ardashir I there had been no intercalation. Thus with a quarter-day being lost each year, the Zoroastrian holy year had slowly slipped backwards, with Nowruz eventually ending up in July. A great council was therefore convened and it was decided that Nowruz be moved back to the original position it had during the Achaemenid period—back to spring. This change probably took place during the reign of Kavad I in the early 6th century. Much emphasis seems to have been placed during this period on the importance of spring and on its connection with the resurrection and Frashegerd.

==== Three Great Fires ====
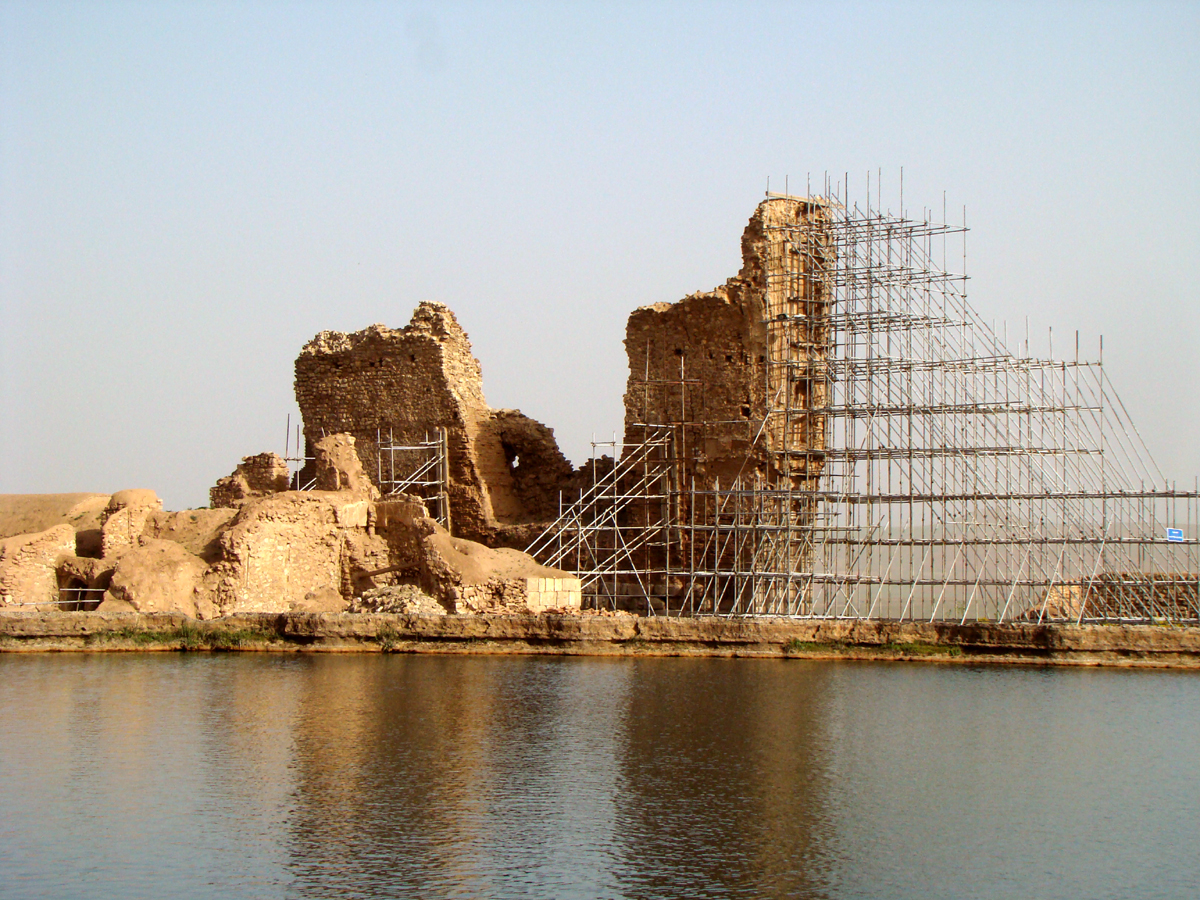
Ruins of Adur Gushnasp, one of three main Zoroastrian temples in the Sassanian Empire

The Sasanians are credited for the lighting of the Adur Gushnasp and Adur Farnbag (fa), two Atash Behram (sacred fires of the highest grade) which were located in Media and Pars respectively, and elevating them alongside the Arsacid-era Adur Burzen-Mihr in Parthia (which was considered the most sacred Atash Behram in Iran at the time) to create the Three Great Fires. During the Sasanian era, these three sacred fires became considered the three most holy fires in Iran and were highly venerated, becoming prominent sites for pilgrimage among Zoroastrians and amassing great wealth. Each of the Three Great Fires became associated with a specific class in Iranian society: the Adur Gushnasp with the warrior class, the Adur Farnbag with the priest class (magi), and the Adur Burzen-Mihr with the farmer class.

==== Iconoclasm and the elevation of Persian over other Iranian languages ====
The early Sasanians ruled against the use of cult images in worship, and so statues and idols were removed from many temples and, where possible, sacred fires were installed instead. This policy extended even to the 'non-Iran' regions of the empire during some periods. Hormizd I allegedly destroyed statues erected for the dead in Armenia. However, only cult-statues were removed. The Sasanians continued to use images to represent the deities of Zoroastrianism, including that of Ahura Mazda, in the tradition that was established during the Seleucid era.

In the early Sasanian period royal inscriptions often consisted of Parthian, Middle Persian and Greek. However, the last time Parthian was used for a royal inscription came during the reign of Narseh, son of Shapur I. It is likely therefore that soon after this, the Sasanians made the decision to impose Persian as the sole official language within Iran, and forbade the use of written Parthian. This had important consequences for Zoroastrianism, given that all secondary literature, including the Zand, was then recorded only in Middle Persian, having a profound impact in orienting Zoroastrianism towards the influence of the Pars region, the homeland of the Sasanians.

==== Developments in literature and liturgy ====
Some scholars of Zoroastrianism such as Mary Boyce have speculated that it is possible that the yasna service was lengthened during the Sasanian era "to increase its impressiveness". This appears to have been done by joining the Gathic Staota Yesnya with the haoma ceremony. Furthermore, it is believed that another longer service developed, known as the Visperad, which derived from the extended yasna. This was developed for the celebration of the seven holy days of obligation (the Gahambars plus Nowruz) and was dedicated to Ahura Mazda.

While the very earliest Zoroastrians eschewed writing as a form of demonic practice, the Middle Persian Zand, along with much secondary Zoroastrian literature, was recorded in writing during the Sasanian era for the first time. Many of these Zoroastrian texts were original works from the Sasanian period. Perhaps the most important of these works was the Bundahishn—the mythical Zoroastrian story of Creation. Other older works, some from remote antiquity, were possibly translated from different Iranian languages into Middle Persian during this period. For example, two works, the Drakht-i Asurig (Assyrian Tree) and Ayadgar-i Zareran (Exploits of Zarter) were probably translated from Parthian originals.

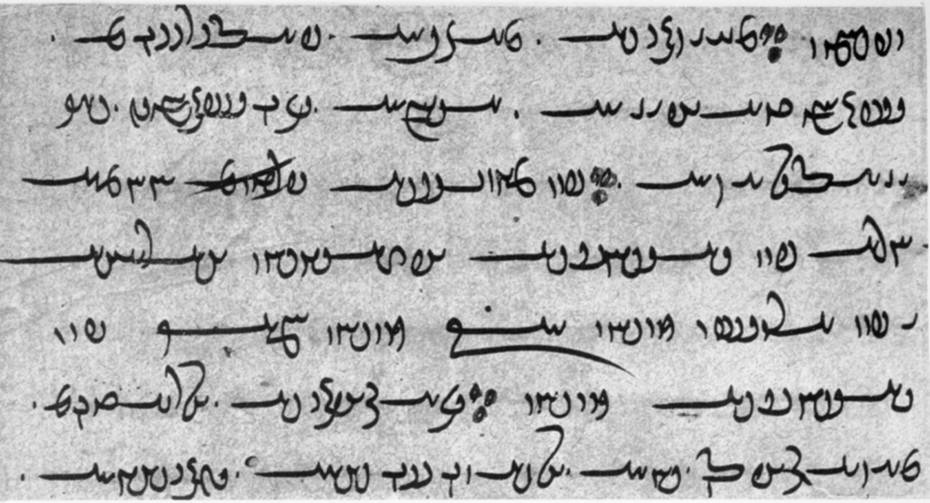
The Sasanians developed an accurate, phonetic alphabet to write down the sacred Avesta.

Of great importance for Zoroastrianism was the creation of the Avestan alphabet under the Sasanians, which enabled the accurate rendering of the Avestan texts in written form (including in its original language/phonology) for the first time. This alphabet was based on the Pahlavi script, a purely consonantal writing system. However, unlike that script, which was not well adapted for even recording spoken Middle Persian, the Avestan alphabet was a fully phonetic alphabet using 46 letters; one for each sound of Avestan. It was, therefore, specifically designed to record Avestan in written form in exactly the way the language actually sounded. As a result, the Persian magi were finally able to faithfully record all surviving ancient Avestan texts in written form. As a result of this development, the Sasanian Avesta was then compiled into 21 nasks (divisions) to correspond with the 21 words of the Ahunavar manthra.

An important literary text, the Khwaday-Namag (Book of Kings), was composed during the Sasanian era. This text is the basis of the later Shahnameh of Ferdowsi. Another important Zoroastrian text from the Sasanian period includes the Dadestan-e Menog-e Khrad (Judgments of the Spirit of Wisdom).

=== Christianity ===
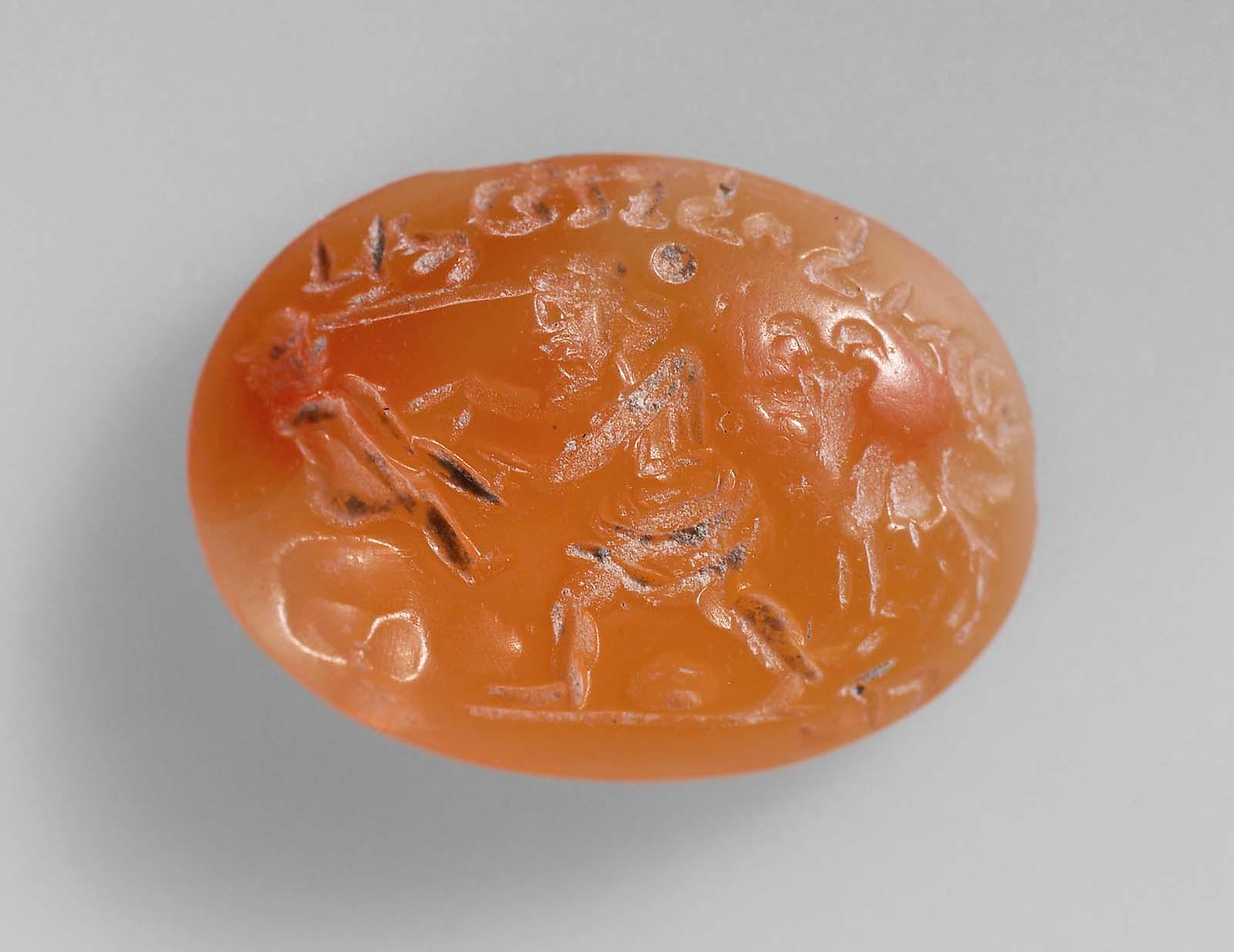
Sasanian-era cornelian gem, depicting the sacrifice of Isaac, 4th–5th century AD.

Christians in the Sasanian Empire belonged mainly to the Church of the East and the Syriac Orthodox Church. Although these churches originally maintained ties with Christian churches in the Roman Empire, they were quite different from them: the liturgical language of the Nestorian and Jacobite Churches was Syriac rather than Greek. Another reason for a separation between Eastern and Western Christianity was strong pressure from the Sasanian authorities to sever connections with Rome, since the Sasanian Empire was often at war with the Roman Empire.

Christianity was recognized by Yazdegerd I in 409 as an allowable faith within the Sasanian Empire.

The major break with mainstream Christianity came in 431, due to the pronouncements of the First Council of Ephesus. The Council condemned Nestorius, the patriarch of Constantinople, for teaching a view of Christology in accordance with which he was reluctant to call Mary, mother of Jesus, "Theotokos", or Mother of God. While the teaching of the Council of Ephesus was accepted within the Roman Empire, the Sasanian church disagreed with the condemnation of Nestorius' teachings. When Nestorius was deposed as patriarch, a number of his followers fled to the Sasanian Empire. Persian emperors used this opportunity to strengthen Nestorius' position within the Sasanian church (which made up the vast majority of the Christians in the predominantly Zoroastrian Persian Empire) by eliminating the most important pro-Roman clergymen in Persia and making sure that their places were taken by Nestorians. This was to assure that these Christians would be loyal to the Persian Empire, and not to the Roman.

Most of the Christians in the Sasanian Empire lived on the western edge of the empire, predominantly in Mesopotamia, but there were also important extant communities in the more northern territories, namely Caucasian Albania, Lazica, Iberia, and the Persian part of Armenia. Other important communities were to be found on the island of Tylos (present day Bahrain), the southern coast of the Persian Gulf, and the area of the Arabian kingdom of Lakhm. Some of these areas were the earliest to be Christianized; the kingdom of Armenia became the first independent Christian state in the world in 301. While a number of Assyrian territories had almost become fully Christianized even earlier during the 3rd century, they never became independent nations.

=== Manichaeism ===
Mani, the founder of Manichaeism, spent the majority of his life within the Sasanian Empire, and Manichaeism itself was heavily impacted by Iranian culture and religion. Shahanshah Shapur I was said to be fascinated with Manichaeism when Mani presented it to him, and supported the spread of Manichaeism. However, from the reign of Bahram I onwards, Sasanian tolerance towards Manichaeism, as well as the presence of Manichaens in Iran, declined.

=== Buddhism and Judaism ===
Some of the recent excavations have discovered the Buddhist, Hindu, and Jewish religious sites in the empire. Buddhism rivaled Zoroastrian influence in Bactria and Margiana, in the far easternmost territories. A very large Jewish community flourished under Sasanian rule, with thriving centers at Isfahan, Babylon, and Khorasan, and with its own semi-autonomous Exilarchate leadership based in Mesopotamia. Jewish communities suffered only occasional persecution. They enjoyed a relative freedom of religion, and were granted privileges denied to other religious minorities. Shapur I (Shabur Malka in Aramaic) was a particular friend to the Jews. His friendship with Shmuel produced many advantages for the Jewish community.

== Language ==
=== Official languages ===
During the early Sasanian period, Middle Persian along with Koine Greek and Parthian appeared in the inscriptions of the early Sasanian kings. However, by the time Narseh (r. 293–302) was ruling, Greek was no longer in use, perhaps due to the disappearance of Greek or the efforts of the anti-Hellenic Zoroastrian clergy to remove it once and for all. This was probably also because Greek was commonplace among the Romans/Byzantines, the rivals of the Sasanians. Parthian soon disappeared as an administrative language too, but was continued to be spoken and written in the eastern part of the Sasanian Empire, the homeland of the Parthians. Furthermore, many of the Parthian aristocrats who had entered into Sasanian service after the fall of the Parthian Empire still spoke Parthian, such as the seven Parthian clans, who possessed much power within the empire. The Sasanian Empire appears to have stopped using the Parthian language in their official inscriptions during the reign of Narseh.

Aramaic, like in the Achaemenid Empire, was widely used in the Sasanian Empire (from Antioch to Mesopotamia), although Imperial Aramaic began to be replaced by Middle Persian as the administrative language.

=== Regional languages ===
Although Middle Persian was the native language of the Sasanians, it was only a minority language in the vast Sasanian Empire; it only formed the majority of Pars, while it was widespread around Media and its surrounding regions. However, there were several different Persian dialects during that time. Besides Persian, the unattested predecessor of Adhari along with one of its dialects, Tati, was spoken in Adurbadagan (Azerbaijan). Unwritten Pre-Daylamite and probably Proto-Caspian, which later became Gilaki in Gilan and Mazandarani (also known as Tabari) in Tabaristan, were spoken about in the same regions. Furthermore, some other languages and dialects were spoken in the two regions.

In the Sasanian territories in the Caucasus, numerous languages were spoken including Old Georgian, various Kartvelian languages (notably in Lazica), Middle Persian, (Note: "Yet, even at the time of Caucasian Albania and later on, as well, the region was greatly affected by Iran and Persian enjoyed even more success than the Albanian language".) Old Armenian, Caucasian Albanian, Scythian, Koine Greek, and others.

In Khuzestan, several languages were spoken; Persian in the north and east, while Eastern Middle Aramaic was spoken in the rest of the place. Furthermore, late Neo-Elamite may also have been spoken in the province but there are no references explicitly naming the language. In Meshan, Strabo divided the Semitic population of the province into "Chaldeans" (Aramaic-speakers) and "Mesenian Arabs". Nomadic Arabs along with Nabataean and Palmyrene merchants are believed to have added to the population as well. Iranians had also begun to settle in the province, along with the Zutt, who had been deported from India. Other Indian groups such as the Malays may also have been deported to Meshan, either as captives or recruited sailors. In Asoristan, the majority of the people were Aramaic-speaking Nestorian Christians, notably including Middle Syriac, while the Persians, Jews and Arabs formed a minority in the province.

Due to invasions from the Scythians and their sub-group, the Alans, into Atropatene, Armenia, and other places in the Caucasus, the places gained a larger, although small, Iranian population. Parthian was spoken in Khorasan along with other Iranian dialects and languages, while the Sogdian, Bactrian and Khwarazmian languages were spoken further east in places which were not always controlled by the Sasanians. Further south in Sakastan, which saw an influx of Scythians during the Parthian period, much later the place of Sistanian Persian, an unknown Middle Southwestern Iranian language was spoken if it was not likely Middle Persian as well. Kirman was populated by an Iranian group which closely resembled the Persians while, farther to the east in Paratan, Turan and Makran, non-Iranian languages and an unknown Middle Northwestern Iranian language were spoken. In major cities such as Gundeshapur and Ctesiphon, Latin, Greek and Syriac were spoken by Roman/Byzantine prisoners of war. Furthermore, Slavic and Germanic were also spoken in the Sasanian Empire, once again due to the capture of Roman soldiers but this must have been negligible. Semitic languages including Himyaritic and Sabaean were spoken in Yemen.

== Legacy and importance ==
The influence of the Sasanian Empire continued long after it fell. The empire had achieved a Persian renaissance that would become a driving force behind the civilization of the newly established religion of Islam. In modern Iran and the regions of the Iranosphere, the Sasanian period is regarded as one of the high points of Iranian civilization.

=== In Europe ===
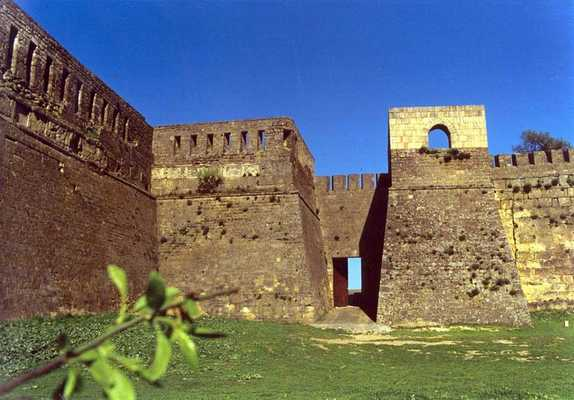
A Sasanian fortress in Derbent, Russia (the Caspian Gates)

Sasanian culture and military structure had a significant influence on Roman civilization. The structure and character of the Roman army was affected by the methods of Persian warfare. In a modified form, the Roman Imperial autocracy imitated the royal ceremonies of the Sasanian court at Ctesiphon, and those in turn had an influence on the ceremonial traditions of the courts of medieval and modern Europe. The origin of the formalities of European diplomacy is attributed to the diplomatic relations between the Persian governments and the Roman Empire.

=== In Jewish history ===
Important developments in Jewish history are associated with the Sasanian Empire. The Babylonian Talmud was composed between the third and sixth centuries in Sasanian Persia and major Jewish academies of learning were established in Sura and Pumbedita that became cornerstones of Jewish scholarship. Several individuals of the Imperial family such as Ifra Hormizd the Queen mother of Shapur II and Queen Shushandukht, the Jewish wife of Yazdegerd I, significantly contributed to the close relations between the Jews of the empire and the government in Ctesiphon.

=== In India ===
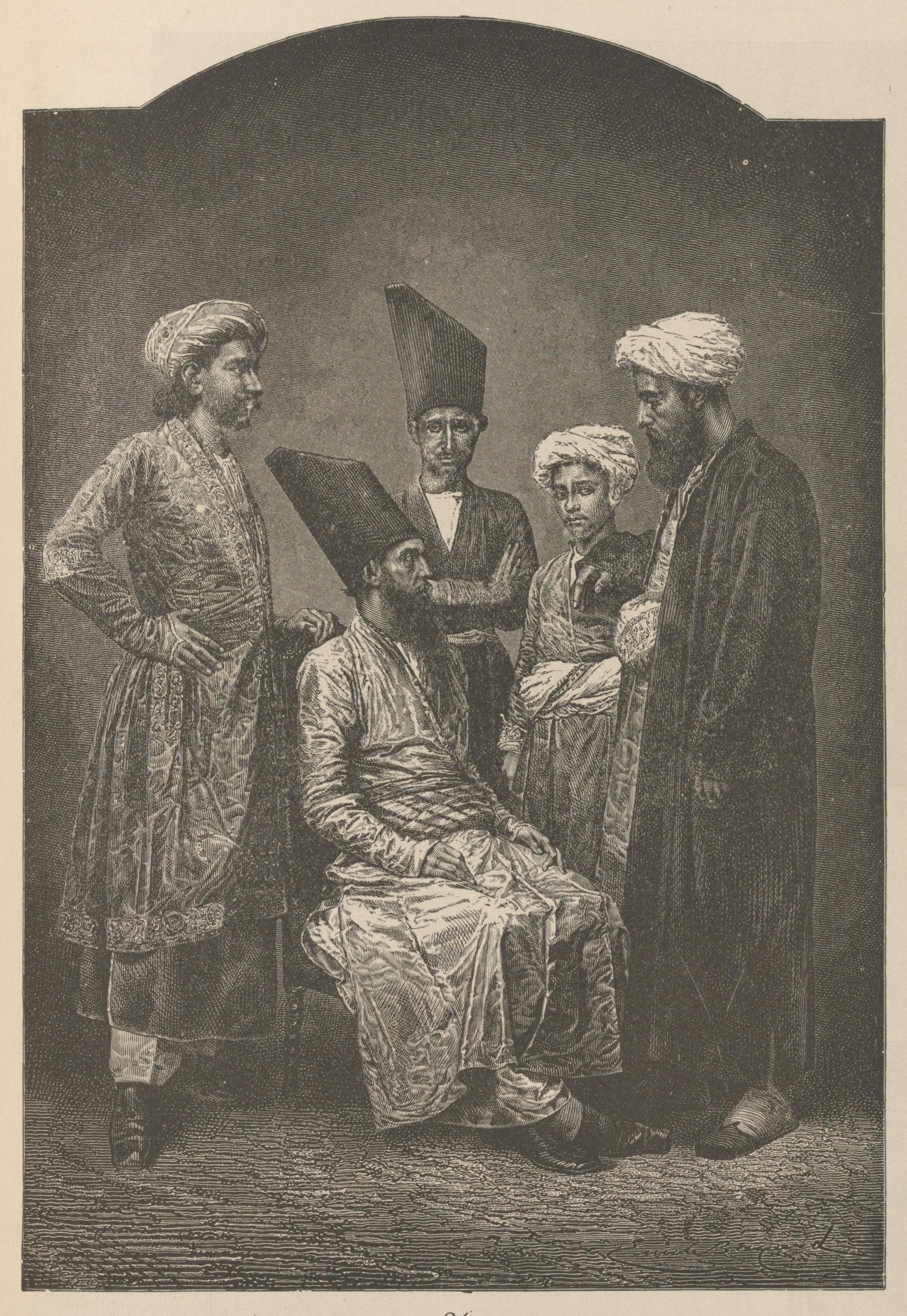
"Parsees of Bombay" a wood engraving, c. 1873

The collapse of the Sasanian Empire led to Islam slowly replacing Zoroastrianism as the primary religion of Iran. A large number of Zoroastrians chose to emigrate to escape Islamic persecution. According to the Qissa-i Sanjan, one group of those refugees landed in what is now Gujarat, India, where they were allowed greater freedom to observe their customs and preserve their faith. The descendants of those Zoroastrians would play a small but significant role in the development of India. Today there are over 70,000 Zoroastrians in India.

The Zoroastrians still use a variant of the religious calendar instituted under the Sasanians. That calendar still marks the number of years since the accession of Yazdegerd III. (Note: See also: Zoroastrian calendar)

== Chronology ==
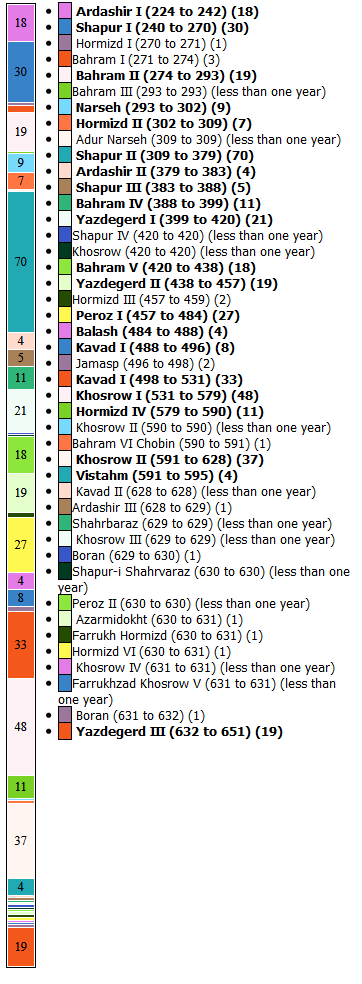

- 224–241: Reign of Ardashir I:
  - 224: Overthrow of the Parthian Empire
  - 229–232: War with Rome
  - Zoroastrianism is revived as official religion
  - The collection of texts known as the Zend Avesta is assembled
- 241–271: Reign of Shapur I "the Great":
  - 241–244: War with Rome
  - 252–261: War with Rome. Decisive victory of Persian at Edessa and Capture of Roman emperor Valerian
  - 215–271: Mani, founder of Manichaeism
- 271–301: A period of dynastic struggles.
- 283: War with Rome.
- 293: Revolt of Narseh.
- 296–298: War with Rome – Persia cedes five provinces east of the Tigris to Rome.
- 309–379: Reign of Shapur II "the Great":
  - 325: Shapur II defeats many Arab tribes and makes the Lakhmid kingdom his vassal.
  - 337–350: First war with Rome with relatively little success
  - 359–363: Second war with Rome. Rome cedes Northern and Eastern Mesopotamia, Georgia and Armenia including fifteen fortresses as well as Nisibis to Persia.
  - 363–371: Armeno-Sasanian War – victory of the joint Roman-Armenian forces at Bagavan in 371. Persia cedes back territories Shapur II had gained following the disastrous Roman defeat in 363.
- 387: Armenia partitioned into Roman and Persian zones
- 399–420: Reign of Yazdegerd I "the Sinner":
  - 410: Church of the East formalised at the synod of Isaac under the patronage of Yazdegerd. Christians are permitted to publicly worship and to build churches
  - 416–420: Persecution of Christians as Yazdegerd revokes his earlier order
- 420–438: Reign of Bahram V:
  - 421–422: War with Rome
  - 424: Council of Dad-Ishu declares the Eastern Church independent of Constantinople
  - 428: Persian zone of Armenia annexed to Sasanian Empire
- 438–457: Reign of Yazdegerd II:
  - 440: War with the Byzantine Empire; the Romans give some payments to the Sasanians
  - 449–451: Armenian revolt. Battle of Avarayr fought in 451 against the Christian Armenian rebels led by Vardan Mamikonian.
- 482–483: Armenian and Iberian revolt
- 483: Edict of Toleration granted to Christians
- 484: Peroz I defeated and killed by Hephthalites. The Treaty of Nvarsak grants the Armenians the right to profess Christianity freely.
- 491: Armenian revolt. Armenian Church repudiates the Council of Chalcedon; Nestorian Christianity becomes dominant Christian sect in Sasanian Empire
- 502–506: War with the Byzantine Empire. In the end the Byzantine Empire pays 1,000 pounds of gold to the Sasanian Empire The Sasanians capture Theodosiopolis and Martyropolis.
  Byzantine Empire received Amida for 1,000 pounds of gold.
- 526–532: War with the Byzantine Empire. Treaty of Eternal Peace: The Sasanian Empire keeps Iberia and the Byzantine Empire receives Lazica and Persarmenia; the Byzantine Empire pays tribute 11,000 lbs gold/year.
- 531–579: Reign of Khosrow I, "with the immortal soul" (Anushirvan).
- 541–562: War with the Byzantine Empire.
- 572–591: War with the Byzantine Empire.
- 580: The Sasanians under Hormizd IV abolish the monarchy of the Kingdom of Iberia. Direct control through Sasanian-appointed governors starts.
- 590: Rebellion of Bahram Chobin and other Sasanian nobles, Khosrow II overthrows Hormizd IV but loses the throne to Bahram Chobin.
- 591: Khosrow II regains the throne with help from the Byzantine Empire and cedes Persian Armenia and the western half of Iberia to the Byzantine Empire.
- 593: Attempted usurpation of Hormizd V
- 595–602: Rebellion of Vistahm
- 603–628: War with the Byzantine Empire. Persia occupies Byzantine Mesopotamia, Anatolia, Syria, Palestine, Egypt and the Transcaucasus, before being driven to withdraw to pre-war frontiers by Byzantine counter-offensive
- 610: Arabs defeat a Sasanian army at Dhu-Qar
- 626: Unsuccessful siege of Constantinople by Avars, Persians, and Slavs.
- 627: Byzantine Emperor Heraclius invades Sasanian Mesopotamia. Decisive defeat of Persian forces at the battle of Nineveh
- 628: Kavad II overthrows Khosrow II and becomes Shahanshah.
- 628: A devastating plague kills half of the population in Western Persia, including Kavad II.
- 628–632: Civil war
- 632–644: Reign of Yazdegerd III
- 636: Decisive Sasanian defeat at the Battle of al-Qādisiyyah during the Muslim conquest of Persia
- 641: The Muslims defeat a massive Sasanian army with heavy casualties during the Battle of Nihawānd
- 644: The Muslims conquer Khorasan; Yazdegerd III becomes a hunted fugitive
- 651: Yazdegerd III flees eastward from one district to another, until at last he is killed by a local miller for his purse at Merv (present-day Turkmenistan), ending the dynasty. Yazdegerd is given a burial by the Church of the East bishop Elias of Merv. His son, Peroz III, and many others go into exile in China.

== See also ==
- List of Sasanian revolts and civil wars
- List of Zoroastrian states and dynasties
- Military of the Sasanian Empire
- Romans in Persia
- Sasanian art
- Sasanian family tree
- Sasanian music
- Women in the Sasanian Empire

== Bibliography ==
=== Encyclopaedia Iranica Online ===
- Chaumont, Marie Louise; Schippmann, Klaus (2016) [1988]. "Balāš". In Yarshater, Ehsan (ed.). Encyclopædia Iranica (Online ed.). Encyclopædia Iranica Foundation.
- Compareti, Matteo (2013). "Chinese-Iranian Relations XV. The Last Sasanians in China". In Yarshater, Ehsan (ed.). Encyclopædia Iranica (Online ed.). Encyclopædia Iranica Foundation.
- Daryaee, Touraj (2018) [2009]. "Šāpur II". In Yarshater, Ehsan (ed.). Encyclopædia Iranica (Online ed.). Encyclopædia Iranica Foundation.
- Daryaee, Touraj (2013) [2000]. "Yazdegerd II". In Yarshater, Ehsan (ed.). Encyclopædia Iranica (Online ed.). Encyclopædia Iranica Foundation.
- Hewsen, Robert H. (2016) [1987]. "Avarayr". In Yarshater, Ehsan (ed.). Encyclopædia Iranica (Online ed.). Encyclopædia Iranica Foundation.
- Khaleghi-Motlagh, Djalal (2013) [1994]. "Derafš-e kāvīān". In Yarshater, Ehsan (ed.). Encyclopædia Iranica (Online ed.). Encyclopædia Iranica Foundation.
- Khaleghi-Motlagh, Djalal (2016) [1989]. "Borzūya". In Yarshater, Ehsan (ed.). Encyclopædia Iranica (Online ed.). Encyclopædia Iranica Foundation.
- Kröger, Jens (2018) [1993]. "Ctesiphon". In Yarshater, Ehsan (ed.). Encyclopædia Iranica (Online ed.). Encyclopædia Iranica Foundation.
- MacKenzie, David Neil (2015) [1998]. "Ērān, Ērānšahr". In Yarshater, Ehsan (ed.). Encyclopædia Iranica (Online ed.). Encyclopædia Iranica Foundation.
- Madelung, Wilferd (2016) [1988]. "Baduspanids". In Yarshater, Ehsan (ed.). Encyclopædia Iranica (Online ed.). Encyclopædia Iranica Foundation.
- Madelung, Wilferd (2017) [1993]. "Dabuyids". In Yarshater, Ehsan (ed.). Encyclopædia Iranica (Online ed.). Encyclopædia Iranica Foundation.
- Pourshariati, Parvaneh (2017). "Kārin". In Yarshater, Ehsan (ed.). Encyclopædia Iranica (Online ed.). Encyclopædia Iranica Foundation.
- Schindel, Nikolaus (2016) [2013]. "Kawād I ii. Coinage". In Yarshater, Ehsan (ed.). Encyclopædia Iranica (Online ed.). Encyclopædia Iranica Foundation.
- Schindel, Nikolaus (2018) [2013]. "Kawād I i. Reign". In Yarshater, Ehsan (ed.). Encyclopædia Iranica (Online ed.). Encyclopædia Iranica Foundation.
- Shahbazi, Alireza Shapur (2018) [1990]. "Byzantine-Iranian Relations". In Yarshater, Ehsan (ed.). Encyclopædia Iranica (Online ed.). Encyclopædia Iranica Foundation.
- Shahbazi, Alireza Shapur (2018) [2005]. "Sasanian dynasty". In Yarshater, Ehsan (ed.). Encyclopædia Iranica (Online ed.). Encyclopædia Iranica Foundation.
- Shaki, Mansour (2013) [1992]. "Class System iii. In the Parthian and Sasanian Periods". In Yarshater, Ehsan (ed.). Encyclopædia Iranica (Online ed.). Encyclopædia Iranica Foundation.
- Subtelny, Maria Eva (2013) [1998]. "Eršād al-Zerāʿa". In Yarshater, Ehsan (ed.). Encyclopædia Iranica (Online ed.). Encyclopædia Iranica Foundation.

=== Other Sources ===
- Asmussen, Jes P. (1983). "Christians in Iran". In Yarshater, Ehsan (ed.). The Cambridge History of Iran: The Seleucid, Parthian and Sasanian Periods. Vol. 3(2). Cambridge: Cambridge University Press. ISBN 0-521-24693-8.
- Barnes, Timothy D. (1981). Constantine and Eusebius. Harvard University Press. ISBN 9780674165304.
- Baynes, Norman H. (1912). "The restoration of the Cross at Jerusalem". The English Historical Review. 27 (106): 287–299. doi:10.1093/ehr/XXVII.CVI.287. ISSN 0013-8266.
- Benjamin, Craig (2018). Empires of Ancient Eurasia: The First Silk Roads Era, 100 BCE – 250 CE. Cambridge University Press. ISBN 9781107535435.
- Blockley, R.C. (1998). "13. Warfare and Diplomacy". In Cameron, Averil; Garnsey, Peter (eds.). The Cambridge Ancient History. Vol. XIII – The Late Empire, A.D. 337–425. Cambridge University Press. ISBN 9780521302005.
- Boyce, Mary (2001) [1979]. Zoroastrians: Their Religious Beliefs and Practices. Routledge. ISBN 9780415239035.
- Brunner, Christopher (1983). "Geographical and Administrative divisions: Settlements and Economy". In Yarshater, Ehsan (ed.). The Cambridge History of Iran: The Seleucid, Parthian and Sasanian Periods. Vol. 3(2). Cambridge: Cambridge University Press. pp. 747–778. ISBN 0-521-24693-8.
- Bury, John B. (2013) [1958]. History of the Later Roman Empire: From the Death of Theodosius I to the Death of Justinian. (in two volumes). Vol. 2. Dover Publications. ISBN 9780486143392.
- Canepa, Matthew P. (2018). The Iranian Expanse: Transforming Royal Identity Through Architecture, Landscape, and the Built Environment, 550 BCE–642 CE. University of California Press. ISBN 978-0520379206.
- Daniel, Elton L. (2001). The History of Iran. Greenwood Press. ISBN 9780313307317.
- Daryaee, Touraj (2008). Sasanian Persia: The Rise and Fall of an Empire. I.B. Tauris. ISBN 9781850438984.
- Daryaee, Touraj, ed. (2021). Sasanian Iran in the Context of Late Antiquity. Brill. ISBN 9780999475584.
- Dodgeon, Michael H.; Lieu, Samuel N. C., eds. (1991). The Roman Eastern Frontier and the Persian Wars (AD 226–363) A Documentary History. Routledge. ISBN 9780415103176.
- Durant, Will (1950). The Age of Faith (PDF). The Story of Civilization Series - vol. IV. Simon & Schuster.
- Farrokh, Kaveh (2007). Shadows in the Desert: Ancient Persia at War. Osprey Publishing. ISBN 9781846031083.
- Frye, Richard N. (1983). "The Political History of Iran under the Sassanians". In Yarshater, Ehsan (ed.). The Cambridge History of Iran: The Seleucid, Parthian and Sasanian Periods. Vol. 3(1). Cambridge: Cambridge University Press. ISBN 0-521-20092-X.
- Frye, Richard N. (1984). The History of Ancient Iran. C. H. Beck. ISBN 9783406093975.
- Frye, Richard N. (2005). "The Sassanians". In Bowman, Alan K.; Garnsey, Peter; Cameron, Averil M. (eds.). The Cambridge Ancient History. Vol. XII – The Crisis of Empire (2nd ed.). Cambridge University Press. ISBN 9780521301992.
- Garsoïan, Nina (1983). "Byzantium and the Sasanians". In Yarshater, Ehsan (ed.). The Cambridge History of Iran: The Seleucid, Parthian and Sasanian Periods. Vol. 3(1). Cambridge: Cambridge University Press. ISBN 0-521-20092-X.
- Greatrex, Geoffrey; Lieu, Samuel N.C., eds. (2002). The Roman Eastern Frontier and the Persian Wars. Vol. II – 363–630 AD. Routledge. ISBN 9780415146876.
- Haldon, John (1997) [1990]. Byzantium in the Seventh Century. The Transformation of a Culture. Cambridge University Press. ISBN 9780521319171.
- Haug, Robert (2021). The Eastern Frontier: Limits of Empire in Late Antique and Early Medieval Central Asia. I.B. Tauris. ISBN 9780755638529.
- Hourani, Albert (2005) [1991]. A History of the Arab Peoples. Faber and Faber. ISBN 9780571226641.
- Howard-Johnston, James D. (2006). East Rome, Sasanian Persia and the End of Antiquity: Historiographical and Historical Studies. Ashgate Publishing. ISBN 9780860789925.
- Hughes, Ian (2013). Imperial Brothers: Valentinian, Valens and the Disaster at Adrianople. Pen & Sword. ISBN 978-1848844179.
- Khanbaghi, Aptin (2006). The Fire, the Star and the Cross: Minority Religions in Medieval and Early Modern Iran. I.B. Tauris. ISBN 9781845110567.
- Lenski, Noel Emmanuel (2002). Failure of Empire: Valens and the Roman State in the Fourth Century A.D. University of California Press. ISBN 978-0-520-23332-4.
- Litvinsky, B.A., ed. (1996). History of civilizations of Central Asia. Vol. 3 - The Crossroads of civilizations, A.D. 250 to 750. Unesco publishing. ISBN 9789231032110.
- McDonough, Scott (2011). "The Legs of the Throne: Kings, Elites, and Subjects in Sasanian Iran". In Arnason, Johann P.; Raaflaub, Kurt A. (eds.). The Roman Empire in Context: Historical and Comparative Perspectives. Wiley-Blackwell. pp. 290–321. ISBN 9780470655573.
- MacKenzie, David N. (2016). A Concise Pahlavi Dictionary. Routledge. ISBN 9781138991583.
- Martindale, John R.; Jones, Arnold H.M.; Morris, John, eds. (1992). The Prosopography of the Later Roman Empire. Vol. III – A.D. 527–641. Cambridge University Press. ISBN 9780521201605.
- Marzban, Parviz (2001). خلاصه تارىخ هنر [Compendium of art history] (in Persian). Elmiv Farhangi. ISBN 9644451775.
- Morony, Michael G. (1984). Iraq After The Muslim Conquest. Princeton University Press. ISBN 9780691053950.
- Neusner, Jacob (1969). History of the Jews in Babylonia. Vol. IV - The Age of Shapur II. Brill. ISBN 9789004021464.
- Nicolle, David (1996). Sassanian Armies: the Iranian Empire Early 3rd to Mid-7th Centuries AD. Stockport: Montvert. ISBN 9781874101086.
- Payne, Richard (2015). "The Reinvention of Iran: The Sasanian Empire and the Huns". In Maas, Michael (ed.). The Cambridge Companion to the Age of Attila. Cambridge University Press. ISBN 9781107021754.
- Payne, Richard E. (2018). "The Silk Road and the Iranian Political Economy in Late Antiquity: Iran, the Silk Road, and the Problem of Aristocratic Empire". Bulletin of the School of Oriental and African Studies. 81 (2): 227–250.
- Potter, David S. (2004). The Roman Empire at Bay, AD 180–395. Routledge. ISBN 9780415100588.
- Potts, Daniel T. (2018). "Sasanian Iran and its northeastern frontier". In Maas, Michael; Di Cosmo, Nicola (eds.). Empires and Exchanges in Eurasian Late Antiquity. Cambridge University Press. pp. 287–301. ISBN 978-1316146040.
- Pourshariati, Parvaneh (2008). Decline and Fall of the Sasanian Empire: The Sasanian-Parthian Confederacy and the Arab Conquest of Iran. I.B. Tauris. ISBN 978-1-84511-645-3.
- Sarfaraz, Ali Akbar; Firuzmandi, Bahman (1996). محموعۀ دروس باستان‌شناسى و هنر دوران تاريخ ماد، هخامنشى، اشكانى، ساسانى [Collection of Archeology and Art Lessons from the Median, Achaemenid, Parthian, and Sasanian Periods]. Marlik Publications. ISBN 9789649049519.
- Sauer, Eberhard, ed. (2017). Sasanian Persia. Between Rome and the Steppes of Eurasia. Edinburgh University Press. ISBN 9781474401012.
- Southern, Pat (2001). "Ch 6 - Beyond the Eastern Frontiers". The Roman Empire from Severus to Constantine. Routledge. ISBN 9780415239448.
- Speck, Paul (1984). "Ikonoklasmus und die Anfänge der Makedonischen Renaissance". Varia, I. Beiträge von Ralph Johannes Lilie und Paul Speck (Poikila Byzantina, 4) (in German). Bonn: Rudolf Halbelt. pp. 175–210. ISBN 9783774921504.
- Stokvis, Anthony M.H.J. (1888). Manuel d'Histoire, de Généalogie et de Chronologie de tous les Etats du Globe depuis les temps les plus reculés jusqu'à nos jours [Manual of History, Genealogy and Chronology of All Nations of the Globe, from the Very Ancient to the Current Times] (in French). Vol. 1 – Asia, Africa, Americas, Polynesia. E.J. Brill.
- Turchin, Peter; Adams, Jonathan M.; Hall, Thomas D. (December 2006). "East-West Orientation of Historical Empires". Journal of World-Systems Research. 12 (2): 219–228. ISSN 1076-156X.
- Wiesehöfer, Josef (2001). Ancient Persia from 550 BC to 650 AD. Translated by Azizeh Azodi. I.B. Tauris. ISBN 9781860646751.
- Yarshater, Ehsan (1983). "Introduction". In Yarshater, Ehsan (ed.). The Cambridge History of Iran: The Seleucid, Parthian and Sasanian Periods. Vol. 3(1). Cambridge: Cambridge University Press. ISBN 0-521-20092-X.
- Zarinkoob, Abdolhossein (1999). Rūzgārān: tārīkh-i Īrān az āghāz tā suqūṭ-i salṭanat-i Pahlavī روزگاران: تاريخ ايران از آغاز تا سقوط سلطنت پهلوى [Ages: The history of Iran from the beginning until the fall of the Pahlavi monarchy] (in Persian). Tehran: Intishārāt-i Sukhan. ISBN 9789646961111. OCLC 46890937.
