= List of Sasanian revolts and civil wars =

This is a list of civil wars or other organized internal civil unrests fought during the history of the Sasanian Empire (224–651). The definition of organized civil unrest is any conflict that was fought within the borders of the Sasanian Empire, with at least one opposition leader against the ruling government.

== 3rd century ==
- 281-283: Revolt of Hormizd of Sakastan.
- 293: Revolt of Narseh.

== 5th century ==
- May 26, 451: Christian Armenian revolt.
- 459-463: Rebellion of Vache II.
- 485: Rebellion of Zarer.

== 6th century ==
- 530 or 537: Rebellion of Kawus.
- 550: Revolt of Anoshazad.
- 589-591: Sasanian civil war.
- 591–596 or 594/5–600: Rebellion of Vistahm.

== 7th century ==
- 595-602: Rebellion of Vistahm.
- February 23–25, 628: Revolt of Kavad II.
- 628-632: Sasanian civil war.
- 27 April 629: Revolt and usurpation of Shahrbaraz.
- 17 June 629: Overthrow of Shahrbaraz by Borandukht.
- 630: Attempted usurpation of Khosrow III.
- 630: Usurpation by Shapur-i Shahrvaraz.
- 630: Attempted usurpation of Peroz II.
- 630: Overthrow of Shapur-i Shahrvaraz by Farrukh Hormizd, successful seizure of the throne by Azarmidokht.
- 630: Attempted usurpation of Farrukh Hormizd.
- 630: Attempted usurpation of Hormizd VI.
- 631: Attempted usurpation of Khosrow IV.
- 631: Successful coup by Rostam Farrokhzad; Azarmidokht is killed, and Borandukht is restored to throne.
- 632: Revolt of Piruz Khosrow; Borandukht is killed, and Yazdegerd III becomes the new king of Ērānshahr.

== See also ==
- Persian revolts against the Rashidun Caliphate
- Roman–Persian Wars

== Sources ==
- Pourshariati, Parvaneh (2008). Decline and Fall of the Sasanian Empire: The Sasanian-Parthian Confederacy and the Arab Conquest of Iran. London and New York: I.B. Tauris. ISBN 978-1-84511-645-3.
- Martindale, John R., ed. (1992). The Prosopography of the Later Roman Empire: Volume III, AD 527–641. Cambridge: Cambridge University Press. ISBN 0-521-20160-8.
- Shapur Shahbazi, A. (2005). "SASANIAN DYNASTY". Encyclopaedia Iranica, Online Edition.
- Shahbazi, A. Sh. (1988). "BAHRĀM (2)". Encyclopaedia Iranica, Vol. III, Fasc. 5. pp. 514–522.
- Frye, Richard Nelson (1984). The History of Ancient Iran. C.H.Beck. pp. 1–411. ISBN 9783406093975. "The history of ancient iran."
- Chaumont, M. L. (1988). "BALĀŠ". Encyclopaedia Iranica, Vol. III, Fasc. 6. pp. 574–580.
- Dédéyan, Gérard (2007). Histoire du peuple arménien (in French). Toulouse: Éd. Privat. ISBN 978-2-7089-6874-5.
- Grousset, René (1947). Histoire de l’Arménie des origines à 1071 (in French). Paris: Payot.
