= Sasanian crowns =

Iranian crowns

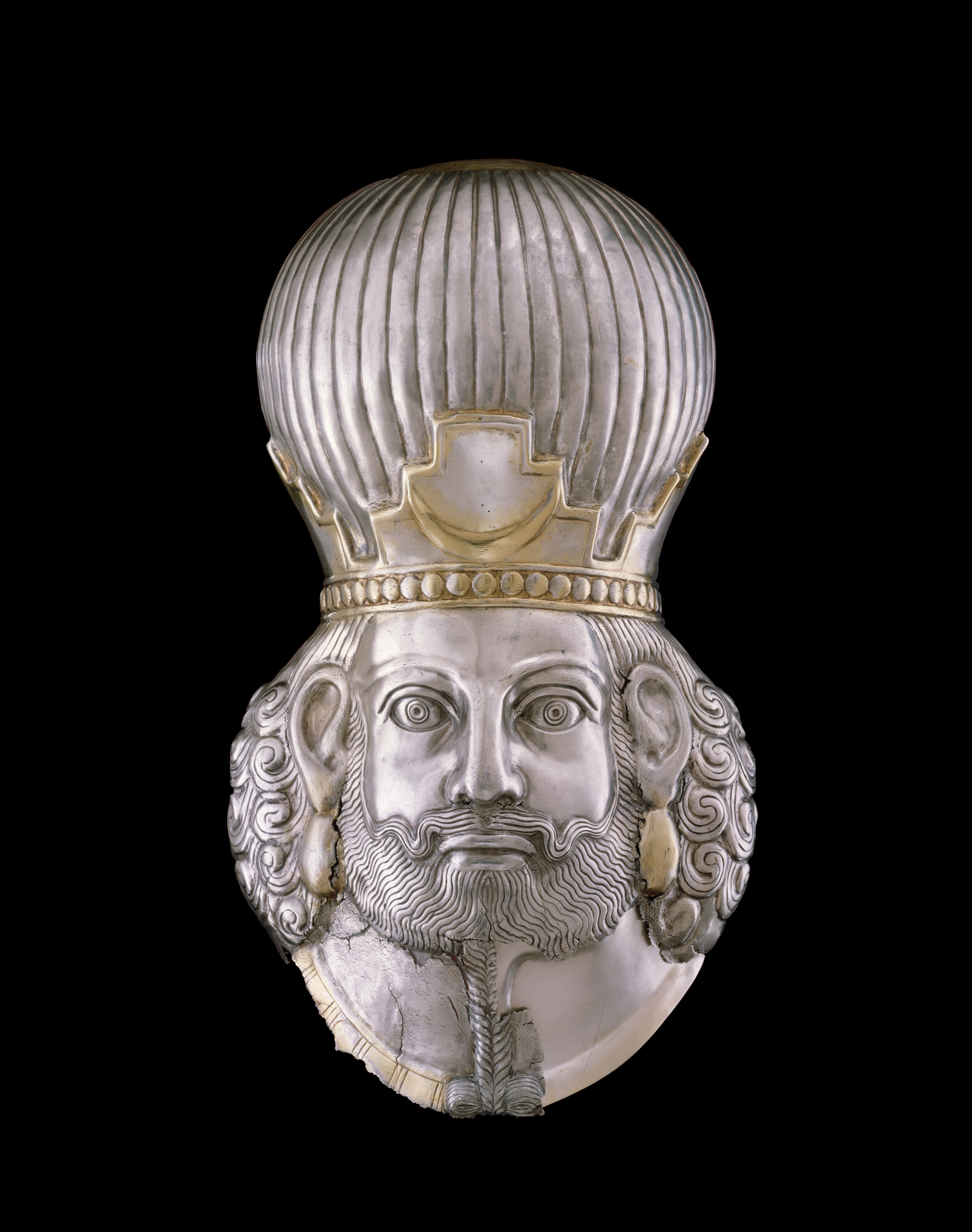
Bust of a Sasanian ruler, possibly Shapur II

Sasanian crowns (Persian: تاج‌های ساسانی) were distinctive crowns used by the monarchs of the Sasanian dynasty of Iran. Each monarch had their own unique crown, and some monarchs had several. Evidence from the Persepolis graffiti shows that Sasanian crowns originated from local Persian styles.

Many of the later Sasanian crowns were suspended by a chain of gold from the top of an arch in the audience-hall as the ruler's neck could not support the weight of the elaborate crown. The later sources cite that the practice of "hanging crown" was extended to any setting in which the monarch appeared, including their deathbed. A crown was also suspended during the birth of a royal heir. The Byzantine Empire adopted this custom from the Iranian court.

Iranian nomads in Eurasia (including the Scythians) regularly wore headpieces decorated with various animal components such as a bird. The Sasanian headpieces decorated with animals may have origins in the 6th–3rd century BC Pazyryk culture.

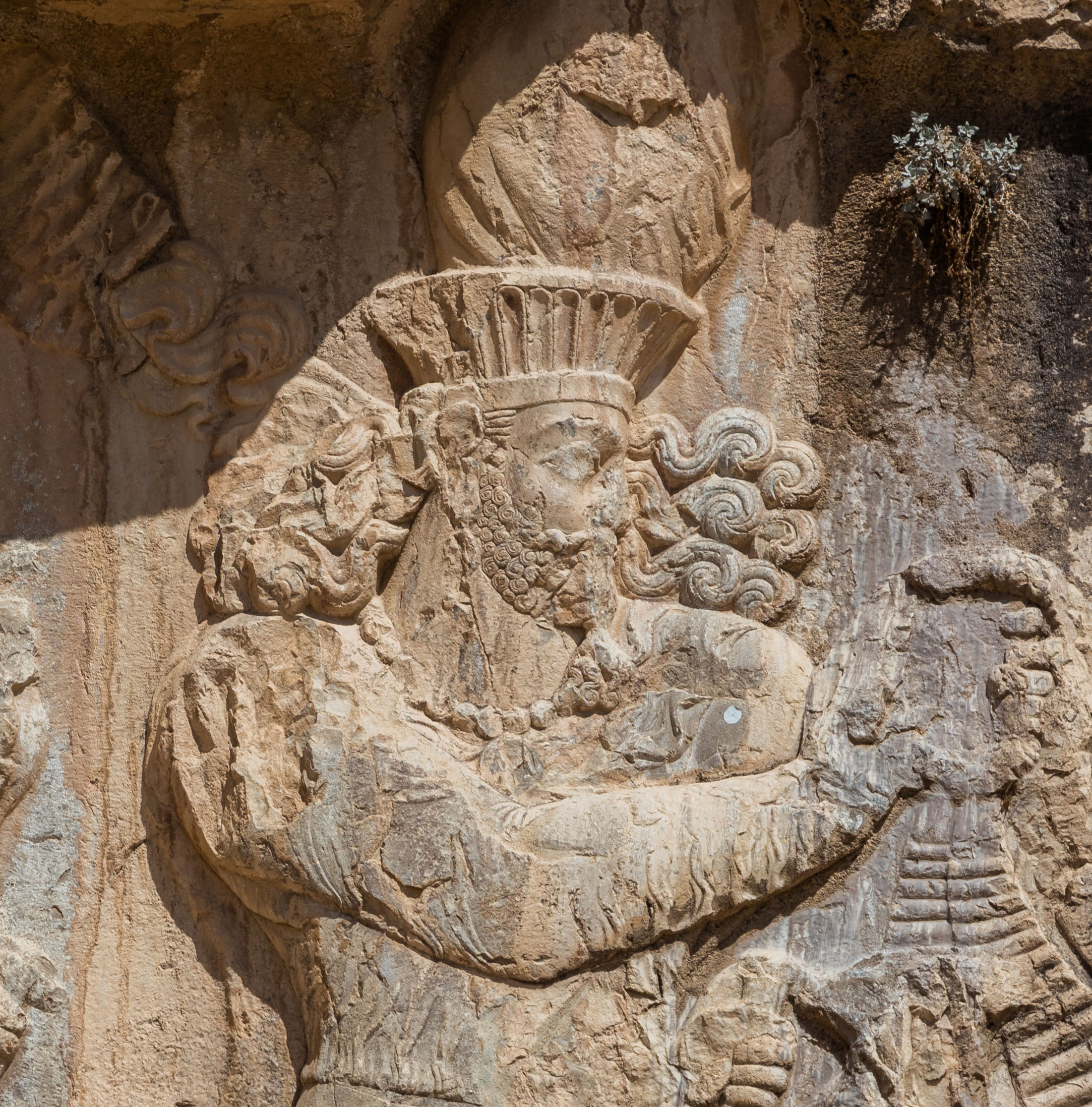
Rock relief of Narseh in Naqsh-e Rustam

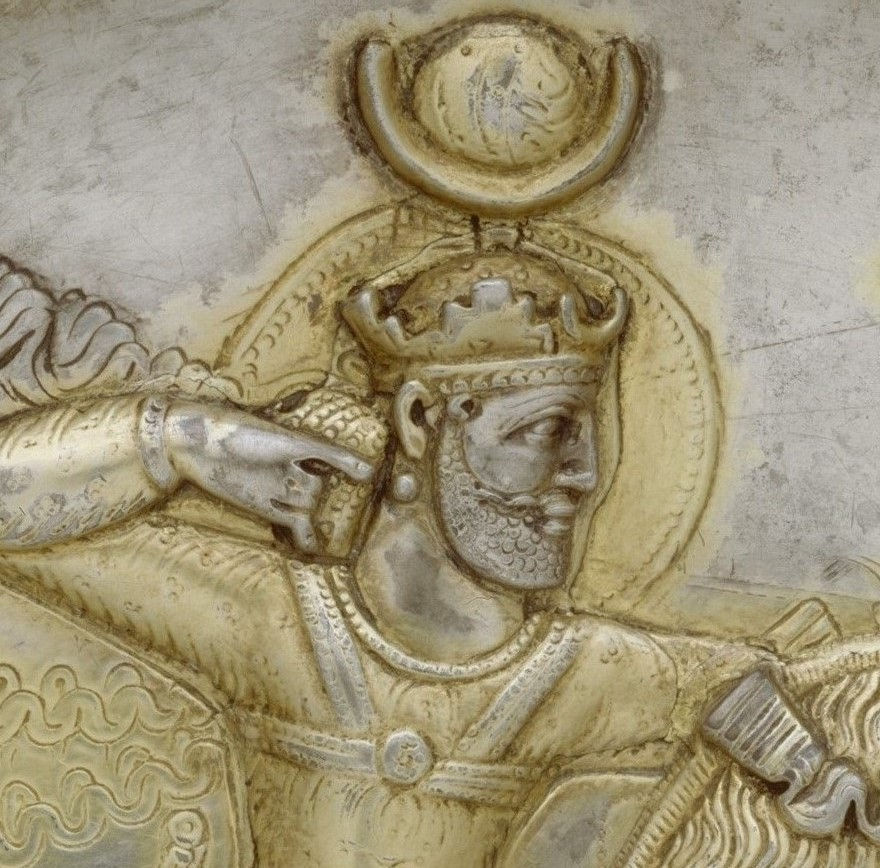
Close-up of a Sasanian ruler, either Peroz I or Kavad I

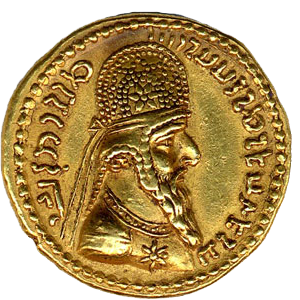
The king of kings, Ardashir I, wearing a Parthian crown on an early Sasanian coin

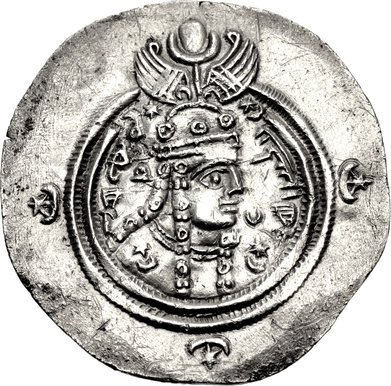
Example of a crown used by a female monarch on a coin of Boran

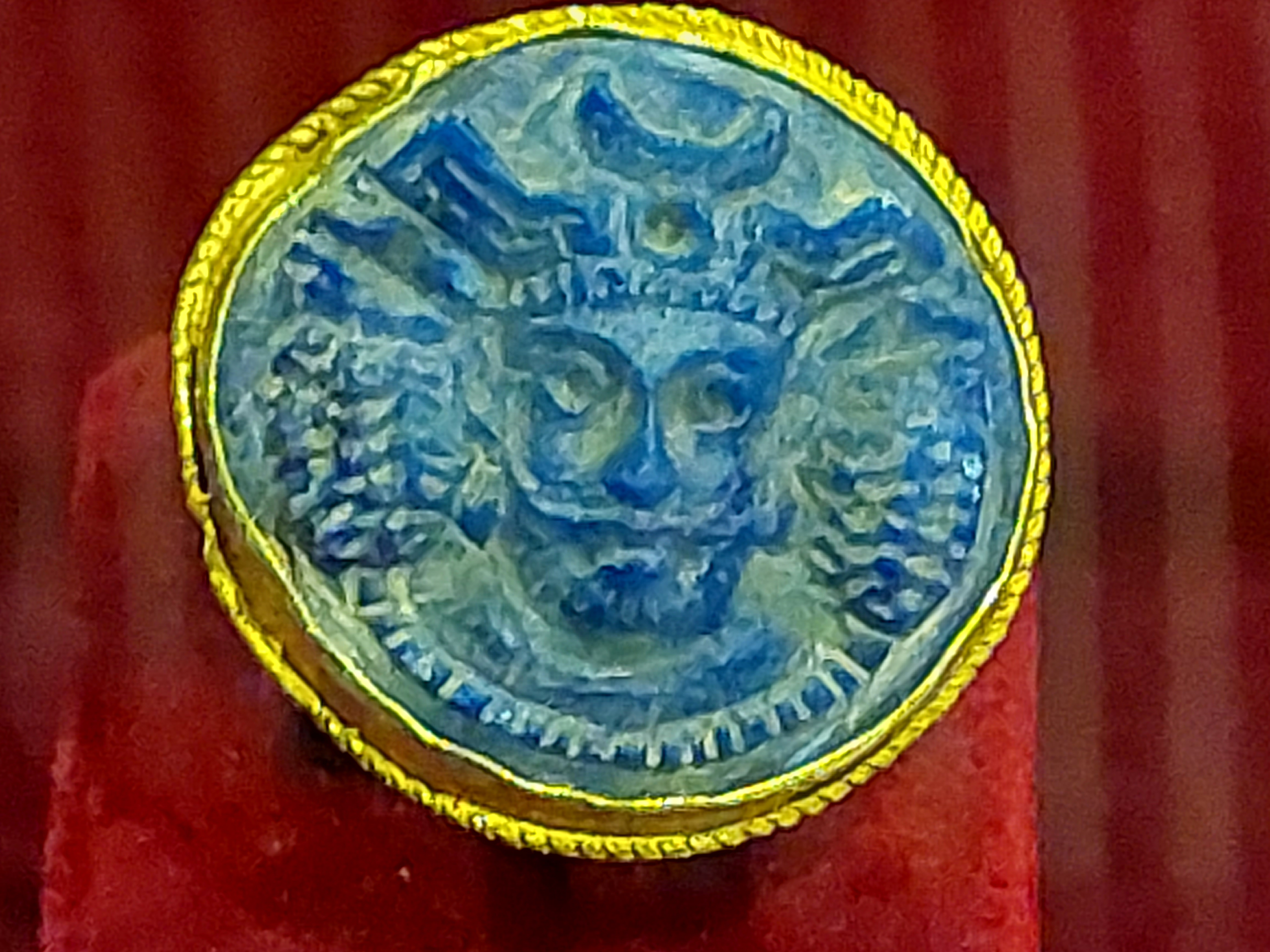
Sasanian king with a crescent moon crown and stepped crenellations on a gold ring

== List of known crowns worn by the Sasanian rulers ==
| Sasanian ruler | Crown(s) | Description |
|---|---|---|
| Ardashir I (r. 224–242) | | |
| Shapur I (r. 240–270) | | |
| Hormizd I (r. 270–271) | | |
| Bahram I (r. 271–274) | | A crown with ray-shaped spikes, a hallmark of the angelic divinity Mithra. |
| Bahram II (r. 274–293) | | The wings on the crown are a reference to the god of victory, Verethragna. |
| Narseh (r. 293–303) | | |
| Hormizd II (r. 303–309) | | The bird of prey on the crown is a reference to the god of victory, Verethragna. |
| Shapur II (r. 309–379) | | Rare coins of Shapur II depict him wearing a diadem without a crown and korymbos. |
| Ardashir II (r. 379–383) | | |
| Shapur III (r. 383–388) | | |
| Bahram IV (r. 388–399) | | Rare coins of Bahram IV depict him wearing a diadem without a crown and korymbos. The mural part of the crown is a reference to Ahura Mazda, while the wings are a reference to the god of victory, Verethragna. |
| Yazdegerd I (r. 399–420) | | Rare coins depict him wearing only a diadem with a crescent attached to it.; Yazdegerd I was the first Sasanian ruler to have a crescent attached to his crown. A connection to a particular deity is uncertain.; A few of his coins depict a ribbon attached to his korymbos. |
| Shapur IV (r. 420–420) | | |
| Bahram V (r. 420–438) | | Under Bahram V, a crescent was placed between the crown and korymbos, which quickly became the common design standard. |
| Yazdegerd II (r. 438–457) | | Under Yazdegerd II, attaching a ribbon to the korymbos became the common design standard. |
| Hormizd III (r. 457–459) | | |
| Peroz I (r. 459–484) | | The third crown has wings attached to it, a reference to the god of victory, Verethragna. |
| Balash (r. 484–488) | | |
| Kavad I (r. 488–496, 498–531) | | |
| Jamasp (r. 496–498) | | |
| Khosrow I (r. 531–579) | | Same design as the second crown of Peroz I but with a different height. |
| Hormizd IV (r. 579–590) | | Same design as the second crown of Peroz I but with a different height. |
| Khosrow II (r. 590–590, 591–628) | | His first crown was the same worn by Peroz I. After his victory against Bahram Chobin, he added wings to his crown, a reference to god of victory, Verethragna. |
| Bahram Chobin (r. 590–591) | | Same design as the second crown of Peroz I but with a different height. |
| Vistahm (r. 590–596) | | |
| Kavad II (r. 628–628) | | |
| Ardashir III (r. 628–630) | | His second crown is the same worn by Khosrow II. |
| Shahrbaraz (r. 630–630) | | |
| Khosrow III (r. 630–630) | | Same crown as Khosrow II. |
| Boran (r. 629–630, 631–632) | | |
| Azarmidokht (r. 630–631) | | Azarmidokht had coins minted in the same style as her father. The obverse showed a portrait of him, with the winged crown representing the god of victory, Verethragna. |
| Khosrow IV (r. 631–631) | | |
| Farrukh Hormizd (r. 630–631) | | Same crown as Khosrow II. |
| Hormizd VI (r. 630–632) | | Same crown as Khosrow II. |
| Yazdegerd III (r. 632–651) | | |

== See also ==
- Korymbos (headgear)

== Sources ==
- Canepa, Matthew (2018). "crowns, Persian". In Nicholson, Oliver (ed.). The Oxford Dictionary of Late Antiquity. Oxford University Press. ISBN 978-0198662778.
- Daryaee, Touraj (2014). "The Last Ruling Woman of Iranshahr: Queen Azarmigduxt". International Journal of the Society of Iranian Archaeology. 1 (1).
- Peck, Elsie H. (1993). "Crown ii. From the Seleucids to the Islamic conquest". In Yarshater, Ehsan (ed.). Encyclopædia Iranica (Online ed.). Encyclopædia Iranica Foundation. ISBN 978-1568590073.
- Schindel, Nikolaus (2013). "Sasanian Coinage". In Potts, Daniel T. (ed.). The Oxford Handbook of Ancient Iran. Oxford University Press. pp. 814–840. ISBN 978-0199733309.
- Shahbazi, A. Shapur (1988). "Bahrām I". Encyclopaedia Iranica, Vol. III, Fasc. 5. pp. 514–522.
- Shenkar, Michael (2014). Intangible Spirits and Graven Images: The Iconography of Deities in the Pre-Islamic Iranian World. Brill Publishers. ISBN 978-9004362345.
