= List of monarchs of the Sasanian Empire =

King of Kings of Iran and non-Iran
- Imperial
- The Derafsh Kaviani, the legendary imperial standard of the Sasanian monarchs

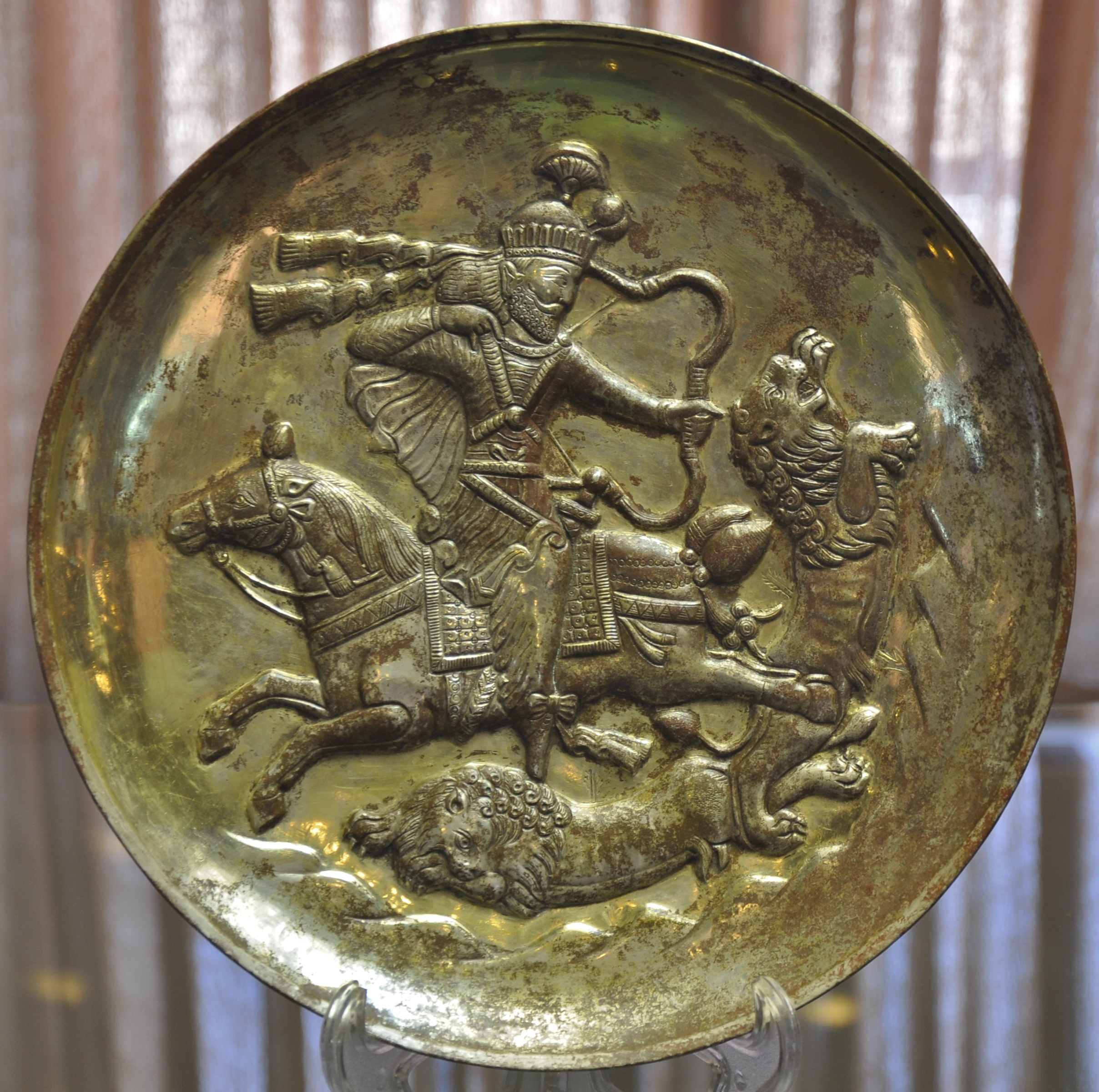
- Plate of a Sasanian king, located in the Azerbaijan Museum in Iran

Details
- First monarch: Ardashir I (224–242)
- Last monarch: Yazdegerd III (632–651)
- Formed: 28 April 224
- Abolished: 651
- Residences: Istakhr (224–226); Ctesiphon (226–637) (winter residence); Gundeshapur (briefly under Bahram I and Shapur II); Hamadan (as summer residence); Dastgerd (briefly under Khosrow II)
- Appointer: Divine right, hereditary

The Sasanian monarchs were the rulers of Iran after their victory against their former suzerain, the Parthian Empire, at the Battle of Hormozdgan in 224. At its height, the Sasanian Empire spanned from Turkey and Rhodes in the west to Pakistan in the east, and also included territory in what is now the Caucasus, Yemen, UAE, Oman, Egypt, Palestine, Israel, Lebanon, Syria, Jordan and Central Asia. All Sasanian monarchs held the official title of King of Kings of Iran and non-Iran.

The Sasanian Empire was recognized as one of the main powers in the world alongside its neighboring arch rival, the Roman Empire for a period of more than 400 years. The Sasanian dynasty began with Ardashir I in 224, who was a Persian from Istakhr, and ended with Yazdegerd III in 651. Throughout its history, the Sasanian Empire had some Parthian rulers who came specifically from the Seven Great Houses of Iran.

The period from 631 (when Boran died) to 632 (when Yazdgerd III takes the throne) is confusing in determining proper succession because a number of rulers who took the throne were later removed or challenged by other members of the House of Sasan. The period was one of factionalism and division within the Sasanian Empire.

== Titles ==
Ardashir I (r. 224–242), the founder of the Sasanian Empire, introduced the title "Shahanshah of the Iranians" (Middle Persian: šāhān šāh ī ērān; Parthian: šāhān šāh ī aryān). Ardashir's immediate successor, Shapur I (r. 240/42–270/72) chooses the titles in a precise manner in the inscription at Ka'ba-ye Zartosht. In that Shapur names four of his Sasanian predecessors with different titles and in "an ascending order of importance" by giving the title (Xwaday) "the lord" to Sasan, "the king" to Papag, "King of Kings of Iranians" to Ardashir, and "king of kings of Iranians and non-Iranians" (Middle Persian: šāhān šāh ī ērān ud anērān;; Ancient Greek: βασιλεύς βασιλέων Αριανών basileús basiléōn Arianṓn) to himself. The title "King of Kings of Iranians and non-Iranians" has also seen on a single silver coin of Shapur I, which indicates that the title was introduced after his victory over Romans and incorporation of non-Iranian lands into the Sasanian realms. The title was later used in coins of all later Sasanian kings.

Yazdegerd I's reign (r. 399–420), marks a shift in the political perspective of the Sasanian Empire, which (originally disposed towards the West) moved to the East. The shift may have been triggered by hostile tribes in eastern Iran. The war with the Iranian Huns may have reawakened the mythical rivalry between the mythological Iranian Kayanian rulers and their Turanian enemies, which is illustrated by Younger Avestan texts. The title of Ramshahr (peacekeeper in [his] dominion) was added to the traditional "King of Kings of the Iranians and non-Iranians" on Yazdegerd I's coins. (Note: The word ram may be translated as "peace", "ease", "pleasure", "joy" or "satisfaction"; it is most likely "peace" in Yazdegerd I's case.) In the Middle Persian heroic poem Ayadgar-i Zariran (The Testament of Zarer), the title was used by the last Kayanian monarch (Vishtaspa) and occurs in the 10th-century Zoroastrian Denkard. Sasanian interest in Kayanian ideology and history would continue until the end of the empire. Bahram V (r. 420–438), on some rare coins minted in Pars, used the title of kirbakkar ("beneficent").

The reign of Yazdegerd II (r. 438–457) marks the start of a new inscription on the Sasanian coins; mazdēsn bay kay ("The Mazda-worshipping majesty, the king"), which displays his fondness of the Kayanians, who also used the title of kay. (Note: The title of kay ("king") had already been in use at least 100 years earlier by the Kushano-Sasanians, a cadet branch of the imperial Sasanian family that ruled in the East before being supplanted by the Kidarites and the imperial Sasanians in the mid 4th-century.) Under Peroz I (r. 459–484), the traditional titulature of šāhānšāh ("King of Kings") is omitted on his coins, and only the two aspects of kay Pērōz ("King Peroz") are displayed. However, a seal demonstrates that the traditional titulature was still used, which indicates that coins do not with certainty display the full formal titulature of the Sasanian monarchs. His brother and successor, Balash (r. 484–488), used the title of hukay ("the good king").

Kavad I (r. 488–496, 498–531) was the last Sasanian monarch to have kay inscribed on his coins—the last one issued in 513. The regular obverse inscription on his coins simply has his name; in 504, however, the slogan abzōn ("may he prosper/increase") was added. Khosrow II (r. 590–590, 591–628), during his second reign, added the ideogram GDH, meaning xwarrah ("royal splendor") on his coins. He combined this together with the word abzōt ("he has increased"), making the full inscription thus read as: "Khosrow, he has increased the royal splendor" (Khūsrōkhwarrah abzōt). The title of King of Kings was also restored on his coins. His two successors, Kavad II (r. 628–628) and Ardashir III (r. 628–630), refrained from using the title, seemingly in order distance themselves from Khosrow II.

== The king ==
The head of the Sasanian Empire was the [shahanshah] (king of kings), also simply known as the shah (king). His health and welfare were always important and the phrase “May you be immortal" was used to reply to him with. By looking on the Sasanian coins which appeared from the 6th-century and afterward, a moon and sun are noticeable. The meaning of the moon and sun, in the words of the Iranian historian [Touraj Daryaee], “suggest that the king was at the center of the world and the sun and moon revolved around him. In effect, he was the “king of the four corners of the world," which was an old Mesopotamian idea." The king saw all other rulers, such as the Romans, Turks, and Chinese, as being beneath him. The king wore colorful clothes, makeup, a heavy crown, while his beard was decorated with gold. The early Sasanian kings considered themselves of divine descent; they called themselves for “bay" (divine).

When the king went to the publicity, he was hidden behind a curtain, and had some of his men in front of him, whose duty was to keep the masses away from the king and to make his way clear. When one came to the king, he/she had to prostrate before him, also known as proskynesis. The king was guarded by a group of royal guards, known as the pushtigban. On other occasions, the king was protected by a group of palace guards, known as the darigan. Both of these groups were enlisted from royal families of the Sasanian Empire, and were under the command of the hazarbed, who was in charge of the king's safety, controlled the entrance of the kings palace, presented visitors to the king, and was allowed to be given military command or used in negotiations. The hazarbed was also allowed in some cases to serve as the royal executioner. During Nowruz (Iranian new year) and Mihragan (Mihr's day, pronounced "Mehregân" in modern Persian), the king would hold a speech.

== List of rulers ==
No.	Coin	Name	Title(s)/Slogans	Reign	Notes
House of Sasan
1		Ardashir I 𐭠𐭥𐭲𐭧𐭱𐭲𐭥 (Ardašīr)	King of Kings of Iran(ians)	224 – February 242 (~18 years)	Declared himself Shahanshah after defeating Parthian ruler Artabanus IV.; Died of natural causes.
2		Shapur I 𐭱𐭧𐭯𐭥𐭧𐭥𐭩 (Šābuhr)	King of Kings of Iran(ians) and non-Iran(ians)	240 – May 270 (~30 years)	Co-ruler since 12 April 240; Subjugation of Khwarizm and Armenia (252).; Victories against Romans; emperor Valerian taken captive (260).; Palmyrene retaliatory invasions; failure to capture Ctesiphon (263).; Manichaeism founded by Mani.; Died of natural causes.
3		Hormizd I 𐭠𐭥𐭧𐭥𐭬𐭦𐭣 (Ōhrmazd)	King of Kings of Iran(ians) and non-Iran(ians)	May 270 – June 271 (~1 year)	Named king of Armenia by Shapur I after its conquest (r. 252-270).; Tolerance of Manichaeism; rise of Zoroastrian priest Kartir.
4		Bahram I 𐭥𐭫𐭧𐭫𐭠𐭭 (Warahrān)	King of Kings of Iran(ians) and non-Iran(ians)	June 271 – September 274 (~3 years)	Oldest son of Shapur I; ascended to the throne possibly with Kartir's aid.; Persecution of Manichaeism under Kartir's influence; Mani's execution; Died of disease.
5		Bahram II 𐭥𐭫𐭧𐭫𐭠𐭭 (Warahrān)	King of Kings of Iran(ians) and non-Iran(ians)	274 – 293 (~19 years)	Eldest son of Bahram I.; Revolts in Sakastan, Khuzistan, and by Hormizd Kushanshah.; Peace treaty with Diocletian (284).; Died of natural causes in 293.
6		Bahram III 𐭥𐭫𐭧𐭫𐭠𐭭 (Warahrān)	King of Kings of Iran(ians) and non-Iran(ians)	293 (~4 months)	Son of Bahram II; ruler over Sakastan.; Proclaimed Shah by nobles in Pars.; Rule disputed by other nobles, who pledged to his grand-uncle, Narseh.; Abdicated in Narseh's favor.
7		Narseh I 𐭭𐭥𐭮𐭧𐭩 (Narsē)	King of Kings of Iran(ians) and non-Iran(ians)	293 – 302 (~9 years)	Son of Shapur I; agreed to Bahram I's ascension in exchange for rule over Armenia (r 271-293).; Proclaimed Shah against Bahram III, who abdicated in his favor.; Battle of Satala (298); crushing defeat against Romans, humiliating peace treaty.; Return to policy of religious tolerance.
8		Hormizd II 𐭠𐭥𐭧𐭥𐭬𐭦𐭣 (Ōhrmazd)	King of Kings of Iran(ians) and non-Iran(ians)	302 – 309 (~7 years)	Son of Narseh.; Resumption of persecutions against Manicheism.
9		Narseh II 𐭭𐭥𐭮𐭧𐭩 (Narsē)	King of Kings of Iran(ians) and non-Iran(ians)	309 (few months)	Eldest son of Hormizd II.; Murdered by nobles who sought more power, and blinded and exiled his other brothers.
10		Shapur II 𐭱𐭧𐭯𐭥𐭧𐭥𐭩 (Šābuhr)	King of Kings of Iran(ians) and non-Iran(ians)	309 – 379 (~70 years)	Son of Hormizd II.; Crowned by nobles for more control, due to his infancy.; Campaigns against Arabs, Romans; expansion into India and Armenia.; Persecution of Christians.
11		Ardashir II 𐭠𐭥𐭲𐭧𐭱𐭲𐭥 (Ardašīr)	King of Kings of Iran(ians) and non-Iran(ians)	379 – 383 (~4 years)	Son of Hormizd II.; Appointed by his brother Shapur II to rule till latter's son Shapur III maturity.; Deposed by nobility due to his attempts at curbing their power.
12		Shapur III 𐭱𐭧𐭯𐭥𐭧𐭥𐭩 (Šābuhr)	King of Kings of Iran(ians) and non-Iran(ians)	383 – 388 (~5 years)	Son of Shapur II; enthroned after deposition of his uncle and temporary king, Ardashir II.; Treaty with Theodosius I (387); Armenia partitioned between Romans and Sasanians.; Fall of Kabul to Alchon Huns (388).; Died in an accident orchestrated by nobles.
13		Bahram IV 𐭥𐭫𐭧𐭫𐭠𐭭 (Warahrān)	King of Kings of Iran(ians) and non-Iran(ians)	388 – 399 (~11 years)	Son of Shapur III; Repulsion of Hunnic invasions (395).; Died in a hunting accident; possibly caused by nobles, whose power he tried to reduce.
14		Yazdegerd I 𐭩𐭦𐭣𐭪𐭥𐭲𐭩 (Yazdekert)	King of Kings of Iran(ians) and non-Iran(ians); Ramshahr ("peacekeeper in [his] dominion")	399 – 420 (~21 years)	Son of Shapur III; Peaceful relations with Eastern Roman empire.; Recognition of the Eastern Church (410); independence of Iranian Church from Roman church (424).; Wars with Iranian Huns.; Died of a disease or killed by nobles.
15		Shapur IV 𐭱𐭧𐭯𐭥𐭧𐭥𐭩 (Šābuhr)	King of Kings of Iran(ians) and non-Iran(ians)	420 (briefly)	Son of Yazdegerd I.; Named King of Armenia by his father (r. 415-240).; Claimed the throne after his father's murder.; Killed by nobles.
16		Khosrow 𐭧𐭥𐭮𐭫𐭥𐭣𐭩 (Xusraw)	King of Kings of Iran(ians) and non-Iran(ians)	420 (briefly)	Son of Bahram IV; installed by nobles who wanted to expel Yazdegerd I's sons.; Removed after his cousin Bahram V's march on Ctesiphon.
17		Bahram V 𐭥𐭫𐭧𐭫𐭠𐭭 (Warahrān)	King of Kings of Iran(ians) and non-Iran(ians); Kirbakkar ("beneficent")	420 – 438 (~18 years)	Son of Yazdegerd I; raised under Lakhmid kings.; Disputed Khosrow's ascension; marched at Ctesiphon with Lakhmid army; crowned after making peace with nobility.; Resumed persecutions of Christians; conflict with Byzantines (421); wars against Kidarites.; Annexation of Armenia (428).
18		Yazdegerd II 𐭩𐭦𐭣𐭪𐭥𐭲𐭩 (Yazdekert)	King of Kings of Iran(ians) and non-Iran(ians); Kay ("king")	438 – 457 (~19 years)	Son of Bahram V.; Byzantine-Sasanian war (440).; Increased persecutions of Christians; failed Armenian revolt (451).; Intense warfare against Kidarites.
19		Hormizd III 𐭠𐭥𐭧𐭥𐭬𐭦𐭣 (Ōhrmazd)	King of Kings of Iran(ians) and non-Iran(ians)	457 – 459 (~2 years)	Eldest son of Yazdegerd II; named governor of Sakastan by his father.; Ascended to the throne after his father's death.; Rebellion by his brother Peroz, who defeated and possibly killed him.
20		Peroz I 𐭯𐭩𐭫𐭥𐭰 (Pērōz)	King of Kings of Iran(ians) and non-Iran(ians); Kay (king)	457 – 484 (~27 years)	Younger son of Yazdegerd II.; Revolted against his brother's ascension; overthrew him with the support of Hepthalites.; Failed campaigns against Hephthalites; loss of eastern regions; defeated and killed in battle.
21		Balash 𐭥𐭥𐭣𐭠𐭧𐭱𐭩 (Walākhsh)	King of Kings of Iran(ians) and non-Iran(ians); Hukay ("the good king")	484 – 488 (~4 years)	Son of Yazdegerd II; crowned after this brother's death in battle.; De facto rule by Sukhra.; Tributary peace with Hephthalites.; Failed revolt by Peroz I's son Zarir.; Deposed and blinded by Sukhra.
22		Kavad I 𐭪𐭥𐭠𐭲 (Kawād)	King of Kings of Iran(ians) and non-Iran(ians); Kay ("king")	488 – 496 (~8 years)	Son of Peroz I; nephew of Balash.; Crowned by Sukhra after Balash's deposition.; Execution of Sukhra (493).; Rise of Mazdakism; its use by Kavad to curb the power of nobility.; Alienated the nobles, who deposed and imprisoned him.
23		Jamasp 𐭩𐭠𐭬𐭠𐭮𐭯 (Jāmāsp)	King of Kings of Iran(ians) and non-Iran(ians)	496 – 498 (~2 years)	Brother of Kavad I; installed by nobles after their deposition of Kavad.; Removed and possibly blinded after Kavad I's return with Hephthalites.
(22)		Kavad I 𐭪𐭥𐭠𐭲 (Kawād)	King of Kings of Iran(ians) and non-Iran(ians); Kay ("king"); Abzōn ("may he prosper/increase")	498 – 13 September 531 (~33 years)	Escaped prison and fled to Hephthalites after his deposition.; Restored after agreement with nobility and help from Hephthalites.; Administrative reforms to reduce nobility's power; rise of dehqans.; Anastasian (502) and Iberian (526) wars against Byzantines.; Persecution of Mazdakites.
24		Khosrow I 𐭧𐭥𐭮𐭫𐭥𐭣𐭩 (Xusraw)	King of Kings of Iran(ians) and non-Iran(ians); Ērān abē-bēm kard ("Iranians has become fearless"); Ērān abzonhēnēd ("Iranians became strong")	13 September 531 – February 579 (~48 years)	Son and heir apparent of Kavad I.; Administrative and military reforms.; Wars against Byzantines (541, 572).; Destruction of Hephthalites (563) in alliance with First Turkic khaganate.; Campaigns against Abyssinia; annexation of Yemen (578).
25		Hormizd IV 𐭠𐭥𐭧𐭥𐭬𐭦𐭣 (Ōhrmazd)	King of Kings of Iran(ians) and non-Iran(ians)	February 579 – 590 (~11 years)	Son and heir of Khosrow I; suppressed nobility.; Continuation of war against Byzantines.; Wars against Turkic khaganate (588); victories by general Bahram Chobin.; Dismissed Bahram, who rose in revolt (589).; Overthrown in a coup by his brothers-in-law Vistahm and Vinduyih; blinded and killed later.
26		Khosrow II 𐭧𐭥𐭮𐭫𐭥𐭣𐭩 (Xusraw)	King of Kings of Iran(ians) and non-Iran(ians); Khūsrōkhwarrah abzōt ("Khosrow, he has increased the royal splendor")	590 (few months)	Son of Hormizd IV; crowned by his uncles; possibly involved in his father's murder.; Defeated and usurped by Bahram Chobin (590).
House of Mihran
27		Bahram VI 𐭥𐭫𐭧𐭫𐭠𐭭 (Warahrān)	King of Kings of Iran(ians) and non-Iran(ians)	590 – 591 (~1 year)	General of Parthian descent; revolted after being dismissed and mistreated by Hormizd IV.; Defeated Khosrow II and claimed the throne.; Defeated by Khosrow II with Byzantine assistance; assassinated soon after.
House of Sasan
(26)		Khosrow II 𐭧𐭥𐭮𐭫𐭥𐭣𐭩 (Xusraw)	King of Kings of Iran(ians) and non-Iran(ians)	591 – 628 (~37 years)	Fled to Byzantium; defeated Bahram VI aided by Emperor Maurice; peace with Byzantine empire.; Execution of Al-Nu'man III; end of Lakhmid state.; Maurice's overthrow by Phocas (602); Sasanian invasion under the pretext of avenging Maurice.; Capture of Syria. Palestine (614) and Egypt (618) under generals Shahrbaraz and Shahin.; Phocas overthrown by Heraclius (610).; Failed Avar-Sasanian Siege of Constantinople (626); Sasanian defeats against Heraclius (627).; Turkic invasions incited by Heraclius (627).; Overthrown and killed by his son and nobility.
House of Ispahbudhan
28		Vistahm 𐭥𐭮𐭲𐭧𐭬 (Wsthm)	King of Kings of Iran(ians) and non-Iran(ians)	591 – 595 (~4 years)	Maternal uncle of Khosrow II; deposed brother-in-law Hormizd IV in favor of Khosrow II.; Allied with Khosrow II against Bahram VI; named spahbed of east afterwards.; Revolted after Khosrow II executed his brother; defeated and killed on Khosrow II's orders.
House of Sasan
29		Kavad II 𐭪𐭥𐭠𐭲 (Kawād)	King of Kings of Iran(ians) and non-Iran(ians)	628 (few months)	Son of Khosrow II; overthrew and killed his father.; Executed all his brothers after taking power.; Peace with Byzantines and Turks.; Died in the devastating plague of Sheroe.
30		Ardashir III 𐭠𐭥𐭲𐭧𐭱𐭲𐭥 (Ardašīr)	King of Kings of Iran(ians) and non-Iran(ians)	628 – 630 (~2 years)	Son of Kavad II; crowned as a 7 years old child.; Real power held by regent Mah-Adhur Gushnasp.; Rise of Pahlav, Parsig and Nimruzi factions.; Overthrown and executed by general Shahrbaraz; beginning of Sasanian civil war.
House of Mihran
31		Shahrbaraz	King of Kings of Iran(ians) and non-Iran(ians)	27 April 630 – 17 June 630 (~40 days)	Accomplished general against Byzantines; brother-in-law of Khosrow II.; Captured Ctesiphon and overthrew Ardashir III with the support of Nimruzi and Parsig factions.; Killed in a coup by Farrukh Hormizd, leader of Pahlav faction, who supported Boran.
House of Sasan
33		Boran	Queen of Queen of Iran(ians) and non-Iran(ians)	630 (few months)	Daughter of Khosrow II; crowned by Pahlav.; Deposed by Shapur V and his supporters.
32		Khosrow III 𐭧𐭥𐭮𐭫𐭥𐭣𐭩 (Xusraw)	King of Kings of Iran(ians) and non-Iran(ians)	630 (~3 months)	Possibly a son of Khosrow II; escaped to Turks during Kavad II's purge of his brothers.; Returned to seize control of regions in Khorasan as shah; killed by the Sasanian governor.
35		Peroz II 𐭯𐭩𐭫𐭥𐭰 (Pērōz)	King of Kings of Iran(ians) and non-Iran(ians)	630 (few days)	Great-grandson of Khosrow I; claimant to the throne after Boran's deposition.; Killed by nobles soon after.
34		Shapur V 𐭱𐭧𐭯𐭥𐭧𐭥𐭩 (Šābuhr)	King of Kings of Iran(ians) and non-Iran(ians)	630 (few days)	Son of Shahrbaraz; nephew of Khosrow II.; Crowned after Boran's deposition; deposed by the Parsig faction who did not acknowledge him.
36		Azarmidokht	Queen of Queen of Iran(ians) and non-Iran(ians)	630 – 631 (few months)	Daughter of Khosrow II; crowned by the Parsig faction who had deposed Shapur V.; Refused alliance marriage proposal of Farrukh Hormizd, leader of rival Pahlav, which resulted in his revolt and assassination.; Overthrown, blinded, and killed by Hormizd's son, Rostam Farrokhzad.
House of Ispahbudhan
37		Hormizd V 𐭠𐭥𐭧𐭥𐭬𐭦𐭣 (Ōhrmazd)	King of Kings of Iran(ians) and non-Iran(ians)	630 – 631 (few months)	Leader of Pahlav faction; overthrew Shahrbaraz and placed Boran on the throne.; Proposed a marriage alliange to Azarmidokht (Parsig candidate); revolted after her refusal.; Assassinated on Azarmidokht's orders.
House of Sasan
38		Hormizd VI 𐭠𐭥𐭧𐭥𐭬𐭦𐭣 (Ōhrmazd)	King of Kings of Iran(ians) and non-Iran(ians)	630 – 632 (~2 years)	Grandson of Khosrow II; proclaimed king by Shahrbaraz's troops in Nisibis.; Killed by the same troops.
39		Khosrow IV 𐭧𐭥𐭮𐭫𐭥𐭣𐭩 (Xusraw)	King of Kings of Iran(ians) and non-Iran(ians)	632 – 642 (~6 years)	Brother of Peroz II; rival king in some provinces.
40		Khosrow V 𐭧𐭥𐭮𐭫𐭥𐭣𐭩 (Xusraw)	King of Kings of Iran(ians) and non-Iran(ians)	March 631 – April 631 (~1 month)	Son of Khosrow II; fled to Nisibus during Kavad II's purges of his brothers.; Brought to Ctesiphon and crowned; killed in a rebellion a month later.
(33)		Boran	Queen of Queen of Iran(ians) and non-Iran(ians)	June 631 – June 632 (~1 year)	Restored by Parsig leader Rostam Farrokhzad who was given full power.; Short-lived alliance between Parsig and Pahlav.; Killed by Parsig leader Peroz Khosrow due to her favoritism towards Pahlav.
41		Yazdegerd III 𐭩𐭦𐭣𐭪𐭥𐭲𐭩 (Yazdekert)	King of Kings of Iran(ians) and non-Iran(ians)	June 632 – 651 (~19 years)	Grandson of Khosrow II; fled into hiding at Istakhr after execution of his father Shahryar by Kavad II.; Crowned as a child by Pahlav-Parsig alliance; end of Sasanian civil war.; Muslim conquest of Persia begins; defeats at Qadisiyyah (636) and Nahavand (642); fall of Ctesiphon (637); subjugation of Pars (650).; Fled the Arabs from place to place; alienated and was defeated by Merv's marzban; killed by a miller afterwards.
Claimants to Sasanian throne
42		Peroz III 𐭯𐭩𐭫𐭥𐭰 (Pērōz)	Governor of Persia; King of Persia	651 – 679 (~28 years)	Son of Yazdegerd III; head of Persia Governorate of Tang China (661).; Fled to China (670) after Arab conquest of Persia.; Served as a Tang general in Tokharistan till death.
43		Narseh III 𐭭𐭥𐭮𐭧𐭩 (Narsē)	King of Persia	679 – after 708/709 (>30 years)	Son of Peroz III; served as Tang general with his father in Tokharistan.; Returned to Chang'an in 707, where he spent rest of his life.
44		Pushang; Name in Chinese sources: Bó Qiāng Huó	King of Persia	fl. 723	Served as a Tang general.
45		Name in Chinese sources: Mù Shānuò	King of Persia	fl. 726 – 731	Served as a Tang general

== See also ==
- Sasanian family tree
- List of monarchs of Iran
- List of monarchs of Parthia

== Sources ==
- Daryaee, Touraj (2012). The Oxford handbook of Iranian history. Oxford: Oxford University Press. ISBN 9780199732159. OCLC 670375356.
- Daryaee, Touraj (2014). Sasanian Persia: The Rise and Fall of an Empire. I.B.Tauris. pp. 1–240. ISBN 978-0857716668.
- Daryaee, Touraj. "Yazdegerd II". Encyclopaedia Iranica.
- Daryaee, Touraj; Rezakhani, Khodadad (2017). "The Sasanian Empire". In Daryaee, Touraj (ed.). King of the Seven Climes: A History of the Ancient Iranian World (3000 BCE - 651 CE). UCI Jordan Center for Persian Studies. pp. 1–236. ISBN 9780692864401.
- Daryaee, Touraj (2002). "History, Epic, and Numistamatics: On the title of Yazdegerd I (Ramshahr)". American Journal of Numismatics. 14: 89–95. JSTOR 43580250. (registration required)
- Daryaee, Touraj (2019). "The Sasanian Empire". The Syriac World: 33–43.
- Molavi, Afshin (2002), Persian pilgrimages: journeys across Iran (Illustrated ed.), W. W. Norton & Company, ISBN 0-393-05119-6
- Morony, Michael G. (2005) [1984]. Iraq After The Muslim Conquest. Gorgias Press LLC. ISBN 978-1-59333-315-7.
- McDonough, Scott (2011). "The Legs of the Throne: Kings, Elites, and Subjects in Sasanian Iran". In Arnason, Johann P.; Raaflaub, Kurt A. (eds.). The Roman Empire in Context: Historical and Comparative Perspectives. John Wiley & Sons, Ltd. pp. 290–321. doi:10.1002/9781444390186.ch13. ISBN 9781444390186.
- Rezakhani, Khodadad (2017). ReOrienting the Sasanians: East Iran in Late Antiquity. Edinburgh University Press. pp. 1–256. ISBN 9781474400305.
- Schindel, Nikolaus (2013a). "Kawād I i. Reign". Encyclopaedia Iranica, Vol. XVI, Fasc. 2. pp. 136–141.
- Schindel, Nikolaus (2013b). "Kawād I ii. Coinage". Encyclopaedia Iranica, Vol. XVI, Fasc. 2. pp. 141–143.
- Schindel, Nikolaus (2013c). "Sasanian Coinage". In Potts, Daniel T. (ed.). The Oxford Handbook of Ancient Iran. Oxford University Press. ISBN 978-0199733309.
- Shayegan, M. Rahim (2013). "Sasanian political ideology". In Potts, Daniel T. (ed.). The Oxford Handbook of Ancient Iran. Oxford University Press. pp. 1–1021. ISBN 9780190668662.
