= Women in the Sasanian Empire =

Aspect of ancient Iranian society

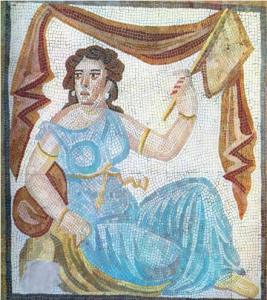
Sasanian-era artwork of an Iranian woman.

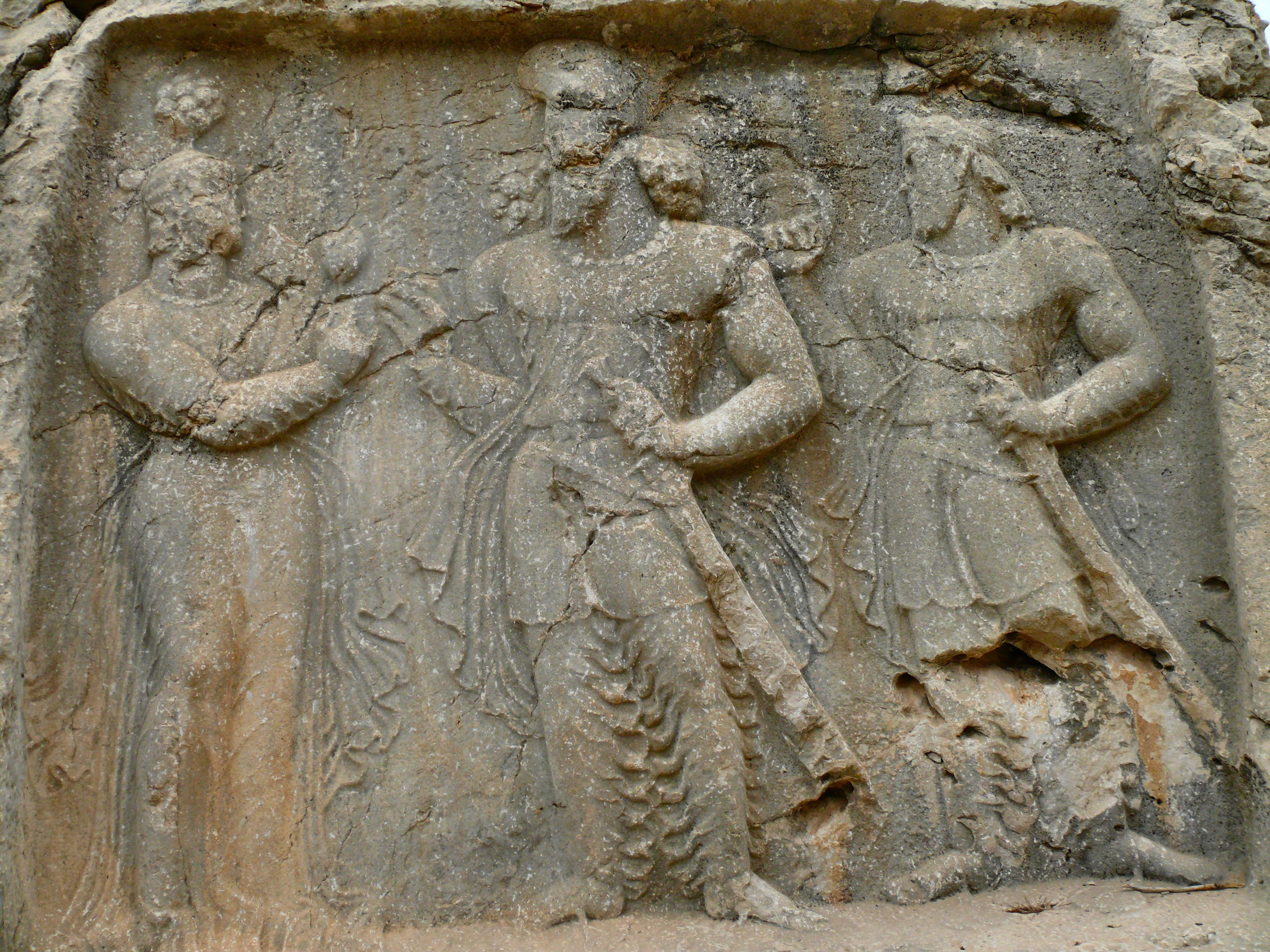
Relief depicting a divine investiture scene of a Sassanid king receiving a flower from his queen.

In the Sasanian Empire, the state religion Zoroastrianism created the policy that dictated relationships between men and women. Zoroastrianism set what roles women would have, the marriage practices, women's privileges in Sasanian society. The moral standards, the structure of life, and the practices of the Sasanian society were found by looking at the religious writing and laws of the time. Women had legal rights, such as rights to own real estate, but the privileges a woman had depended on what type of wife she was (privileged, subordinate, or self-entrusted/self-dependent), her caste, and whether restrictions were placed on her.

== Roles of women ==
Zoroastrianism was the dominant religion in the Sasanian Empire, especially in the upper classes of society. The Sasanian Empire's population also included Arab, Christian, Jewish, and Turkic subjects within its realm. However, Zoroastrianism gained so much power and influence that it eventually became the state religion. Specifically, the Zoroastrian sect of Zurvanism became the official state religion. Because Zoroastrianism was a patriarchal religion, it restricted and limited the roles of women in the Sasanian society. Women of the Sasanian society were viewed as role models displaying good behavior. Women were expected to accept domesticity as daughters, wives, and mothers, rather than to seek out public recognition. Although women had to be completely obedient to men, they were also allowed certain legal rights and responsibilities. These included the right to enter into contractual agreements and commercial transactions, access to their inheritance, to meet all debts, and they were held responsible for the violations of the law.

The Persian conception of royalty was strictly masculine. The Zoroastrian church did not have any female clergy. Women were presumably always under the authority of a guardian—whether father, husband, son, or other male relative. However, when it came time to choose a new leader, the nobles and priests would not accept as king anyone who was not a member of the royal family. Therefore, two sisters, Bōrān and Āzarmīgduxt, ended up ruling the Sasanian Empire for a short period of time when no other members of the royal bloodline were available.

=== Rulership ===
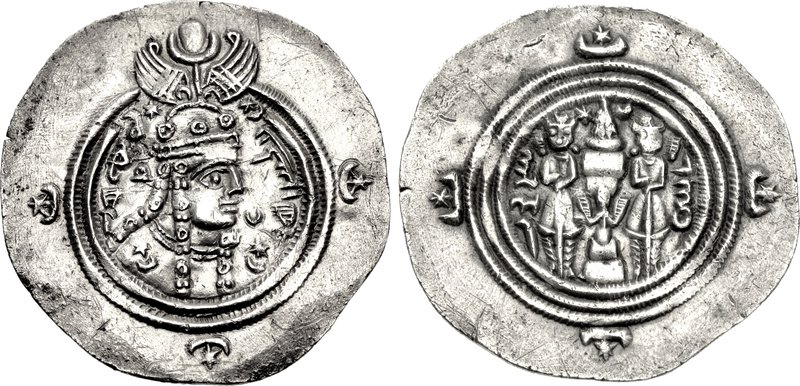
Silver drachma of the Sasanian empress Boran, Arrajan mint

In 628, Khosrow II and eighteen of his sons were assassinated by one of sons, Kavad II, who succeeded him. After only a few months, he died of plague and a period of civil war broke out. Kavad's son Ardashir then took the throne at a very young age. Ardashir was murdered by General Sarwaraz. Sarwaraz was the first king to take the throne that was not from the royal family. He was then murdered. This vacancy on the throne was then filled by Husrav's first daughter, Boran (Borandukht). No other Sasanian woman had ascended as queen regnant before. Boran and her sister were considered to be the only two legitimate heirs left of the royal family.

When Boran came to power, the power of the central authority was very weak due to civil wars. It was Boran's goal to once again bring stability to the empire as her father once had. To accomplish this, Boran offered a peace treaty with the Byzantine Empire. This would revitalize the empire through the implementation of justice, reconstruction of the infrastructure, lowering of taxes, and the minting of coins. Just after a year of being queen, Boran died in 631. It is not known how Boran died. Many sources say she passed from natural causes and Christian sources say that she was murdered by a general seeking to be king.

After Boran's death, her sister Azarmigdukht succeeded the throne for a short time. Azarmedukht "possessed the main prerequisite for the sacral kingship and xwarrah to be" hers.

=== Military ===
Women were involved in the Sasanian military and were even posted in military leadership roles of the empire until its collapse in the 7th century AD. Apranik was a notable Sasanian commander. She commanded one of Yazdgerd III's armies during the Arab invasion of Iran, and died in combat. Roman sources also detail female sardars (generals) in the Sasanian army:

Women are described by Roman sources as being in the battle order of the early Sassanians. They wore scabbardslide swords, donned helmets and wore armor like other cavalry elites. This Sardar wears a tunic with the trident emblem on the front and holds her Dura Europos-style helmet. This helmet has been linked with Sassanian infantry, but may have been used by the Savaran as well. She has a shirt of mail beneath her tunic extending to just above her knees. Her red trousers are of the tight-fitting “Persian” style. The soft leather riding boots she is wearing are still in use among certain tribes of Lurs in western Iran.

== Royal women: Sasanian harem ==
The Sassanian emperors had one chief consort, who was the mother of the heir to the throne, as well as several wives of lower rank and concubines, all of whom accompanied him on travels, even on campaigns. Five titles are attested for royal women: “royal princess” (duxšy, duxt); “Lady” (bānūg); “Queen” (bānbišn); “Queen of the Empire” ([Ērān]šahr bānbišn) and “Queen of Queens” (bānbišnān bānbišn). The rank of these titles has been the matter of debate and it appears that their status varied depending on circumstances and that the highest female rank was not necessarily borne by the chief wife, but could be held by a daughter or a sister. The Sasanian harem was supervised by eunuchs and also had female singers and musicians.

According to Sasanian legend, of all the Persian kings, Khosrow II was the most extravagant in his hedonism. He searched his realm to find the most beautiful girls, and it was rumored that about 3,000 of them were kept in his harem. This practice was widely condemned by the public, who abhorred of him keeping those girls in seclusion and denying them the benefit of marriage and progeny, and it was counted as the fourth of the eight crimes for which he was later tried and executed. Khosrow himself claimed that he sent his favorite wife Shirin every year to offer them a possibility of leaving his harem with a dowry for marriage, but that their luxurious lifestyle always prompted them to refuse his offer.

== Marriage practices ==
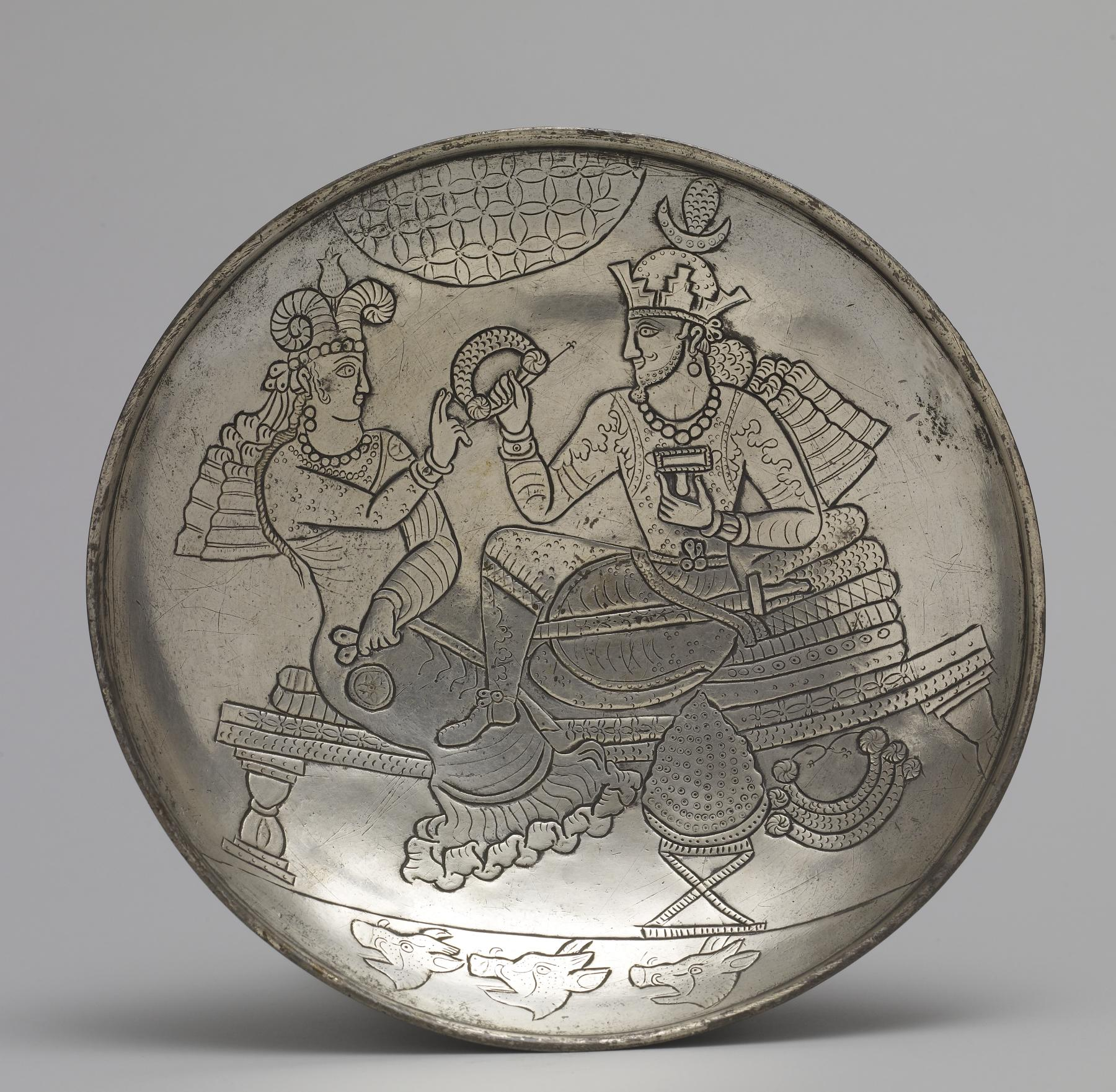
A king and queen seated on throne, possibly at a wedding, from the 6th-7th century

In the Sasanian society, young women were deemed ready for marriage when they reached the age of fifteen or sometimes even younger, and marriage was highly regarded. It was seen as the father's religious obligation to find a suitable husband for his daughter and was recommended that the husband be intelligent, well-brought up, and have productive land. Furthermore, it was the father or guardian's duty to represent the bride and negotiate a marriage contract. The contract stipulated the money and property that belonged to the bride, defined the clout of the husband, and characterized what restrictions could be placed on the wife.

=== Types of marriage ===
==== Privileged ====
The contract, or lack of, also dictated which of the three types of wives the women would be. If the woman did have a contract, she was considered a privileged (pādixšāy) wife. This was the highest position for a wife because there were precise, mutual requirements between husband and wife. The women and her children from this marriage were fully incorporated into the man's agnatic group if he died, and they were also entitled to inherit from the deceased husband. However, if it was proven in court that a woman disobeyed her husband, the court would then issue a "certificate of disobedience" and the wife lost all of her privileges that were given in her contract. Otherwise, the wife received the same amount of inheritance as the sons, while daughters received half of what the sons received in inheritance. The wife was in charge of her children if her husband died, but when her oldest son reached the age of fifteen, he became the guardian. A privileged wife was allowed to have relative independence. She had complete authority over "the internal running of the house, the upbringing of the children, and the organization of the other members of the household." Each man could only have one pādixšāy wife; any other wives were considered subordinate (chagar) wives.

==== Subordinate ====
A subordinate wife lacked the same privileges as the pādixšāy wife, for her husband had the right to acquire her property once they married. Moreover, if a woman was widowed, an adult son or the closest agnate of her deceased husband became her guardian and neither her nor her children were entitled to her husbands wealth. However, she did receive a "small annual income as long as she was of service in the house." On the other hand, her authority over her own children was even limited. Additionally as a subordinate wife, a husband could loan her to another man without her consent. This was done when a widower could not afford to take another wife, but needed a woman for sexual needs and to care for his children. Any children the woman bore were not considered her own, instead they completely belonged to the husband because the Sasanians believed that a "woman is a field....All which grows there belongs to its owner, even if he did not plant it."

A woman was also considered a chagar wife, if she was an unmarried woman forced to marry to conceive a child for a deceased relative. Though technically the woman was considered a privileged wife of the dead relative and her first male child belonged to the dead relative too. Furthermore, half the children produced by the woman were entitled to the deceased relative. This responsibility could impede a woman's chances at marrying "the most suitable husband" because she would always be a secondary wife to whomever she married. This also caused disadvantages for her children because they were not considered members of their real father's group. However, male children had a better chance of receiving support because they could be adopted to become an heir, while the female children's only hope was for the father to provide for them. All in all, subordinate wives and their children didn't have means of actual support, unless the husband or relatives were kind.

==== Self-entrusted, self-dependent ====
Without being penalized, a woman could choose not to marry the man that her father picked out. If this occurred and the woman's father had not found a suitable husband for her by the time she reached the age of fifteen, the woman could marry whom she wished without the consent of her father. Moreover, the father was not allowed to disinherit his daughter for doing this, but if the daughter still preceded in marriage her inheritance could be reduced. This made up the third type of wife, a self-entrusted, self-dependent (khwadrāy) wife. The husband of a khwadrāy wife wasn't duty-bound to support his wife. However, a khwadrāy wife would become a privileged wife after she produced a male child and he reached the age of fifteen.

=== Divorce ===
No matter what type of wife a woman would become, there was always a dowry and bride-price for her. The husband was required to "give a marriage gift of stipulated amount to his new bride." This gift was fully in her possession, including in the case of separation, and the husband could not decline to pay the bride-price. The establishment of this practice had great significance in negotiations and requirements in marriage. For divorce to occur, both parties had to be in agreement, though there were exceptions. The husband could call for divorce without the wife's consent if the wife was guilty in committing certain activities such as "prostitution, sorcery, refusal to obey an order concerning one of her duties, sinful refusal to sleep with her husband, not abstaining from intercourse during menstruation, concealment of the fact she was menstruating, adultery, or committing a deliberate sin which could afflict the body or soul." Additionally, divorce was enforced when the woman had to produce heirs for a deceased relative because she would then marry an agnate of that dead relative. Furthermore, a man was legally required to marry a woman if she was unmarried and they had sex together.

=== Other marriage information ===
Zoroastrian religion in the Sasanian society also led to the rise of next-of-kin marriage (khevtuk-das). Men were allowed to marry their daughters, sisters, and mother. It was "not merely tolerated, but indeed regarded as acts of piety and great merit, and even efficacious against the demonic forces." The religious leaders of the time promoted marriage within the family, claiming it imitated the creation. Moreover, priests claimed that incestuous marriage "produced stronger males, more virtuous females, and higher quality and quantity of children, and it protected the purity of the race and propagated it." This was met by much resistance, led to more conversions from Zoroastrians to Christianity, and is thought to have led to the downfall of the Zoroastrian religion. There was not as much polygamy in the lower classes compared to the wealthy class because men could not financially afford to support multiple wives.

All in all, women could be three different types of wives in the Sasanian society. Which wife a woman was, decided what privileges she would get, what restrictions could be placed on her, and how much support she would get from her husband and his agnatic group. Women also had to give consent to be married. For women to divorce, they needed mutual consent from their husbands, but husbands could divorce their wives without the woman's consent when certain actions were committed. Moreover, women were required to be completely obedient to their husbands.

== The role of the woman in the Sasanian family ==
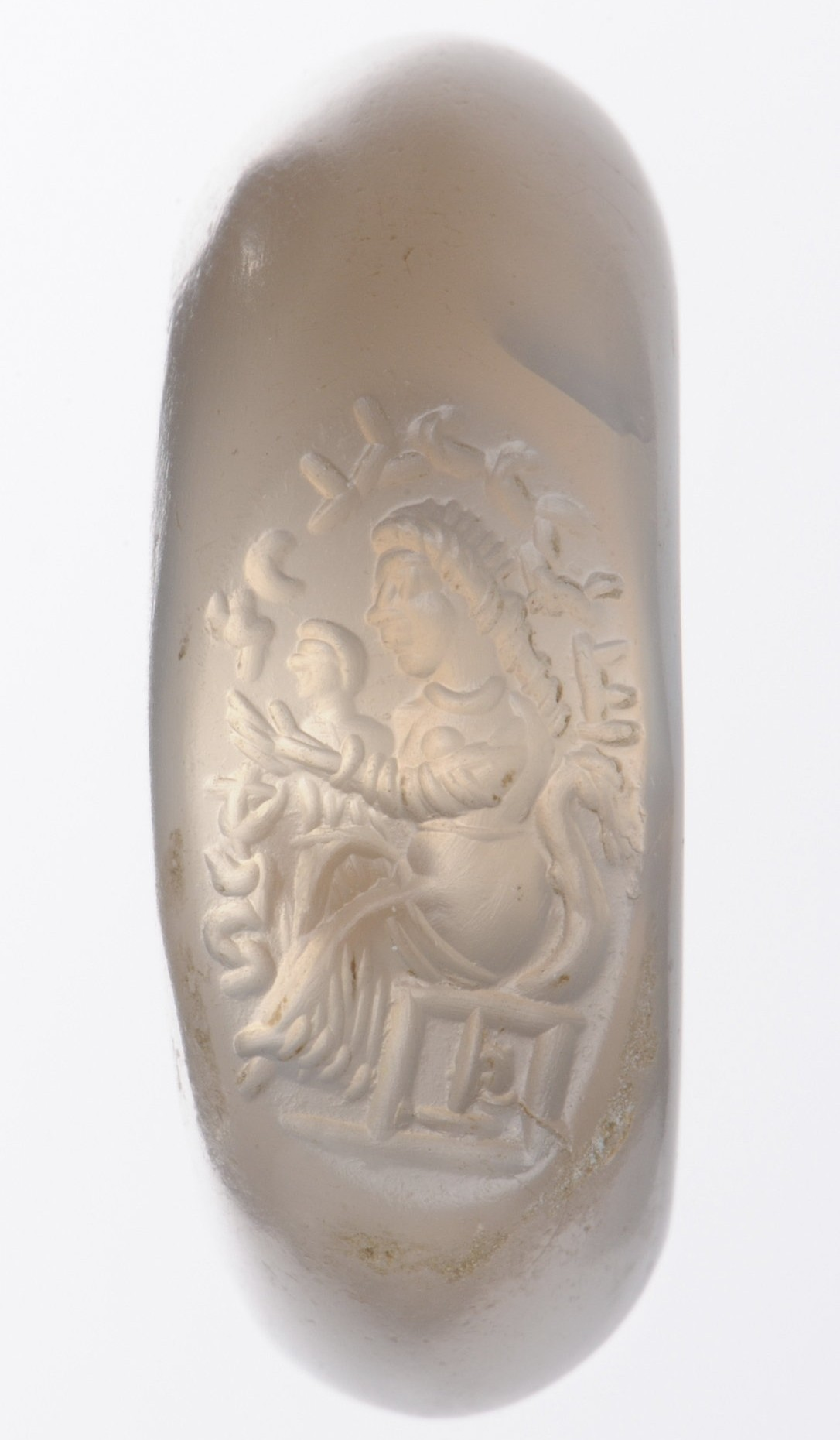
Chalcedony stamp seal depicting a seated woman with a child

According to Wojciech Skalmowski, the Matigan-i Hazar Datistan is a text that describes the laws of the Sasanian family. Skalmowski says that many laws have to do with who inherits and succeeds things that belong to the family and he says these laws are important for keeping the family belongings together. According to Skalmowsky, members of the family have clearly defined positions and the family stays close to produce successors to the male family members.

He says that the master of the house is the guardian of his wife or multiple wives, his children and siblings. Skalmowski says, no law specified who shared the family property so the brothers of the master of the family shared it. Skalmowsky says that if a father dies, the brothers enter a partnership so the land doesn't get broken up and can stay large and profitable. He says that women have important positions as part of the family because they provide children and helped keep the family together. He argues that women are so close to their families because husbands are allowed to divorce their wives and if that ever happened the family still wants to have legal ties to her.

According to the Matiyan-i Hazar Datistan:

- If the man of the family has only one daughter left and no wife or sons and if the daughter's husband breaks up the marriage and doesn't give the wife back to the man of the family, then the "brothers next of kin" can be her guardian. If the sister has a brother, then the brother will become her guardian and she will obtain the ayoken (gain all rights) and her guardian will be the brother's relatives.
- If two brothers and one sister are in a family the younger brother must be the guardian of the sister. If the younger brother dies before the older brother or they both die at the same time the daughter will obtain the ayoken.
- If the women enters into a contract with a man that says he will be with her for 10 years and the father (guardian of the women) dies, a stur "replacement" will be appointed for those 10 years. When the 10 years are up, the woman's relationship is ended and she will obtain the father's ayoken.
- A sister inherits akokenih for the brother of the partner she is with.
- If the brother dies and he has a wife and kids, the sister of the brother becomes akyoken for the "brother with whom she has been co-inheritor or the one who was her guardian."

Skalmowski sums up the Matigan-i Hazar Datistan by saying that the succession goes from father to son and if there is no son, from father to daughter to daughter's son or through a stur to the son. He says the daughters are important because they have connections through both their fathers and brothers. He says that if a father or brother needs his daughter/sister as an ayoken, her family takes over the guardianship.

Skalmowski talks about the term hambayth "partnership". He says that this contract of hambayth says that a son and daughter can co-own their inheritance. He says that inheritance is often land ownership so it benefits the family to have the brother and sister keep the land together in one large plot. He explains that this was a very important relationship and that the brother ended up being his sister's guardian.

Skalmowski says the ayoken keeps the inherited substance in the family versus having to appoint a stur who is paid a salary and his son would inherit the property.

He says that the eldest brother, who would normally be the guardian of the sister, would have his sister as ayoken. He claims that sisters and daughters were very important in the family as successors because the mortality rate of men was high since they had to fight in wars.

== See also ==
- Women in the Achaemenid Empire
- Women in the Parthian Empire
- Shapurdukhtak
- Ifra Hormizd
- Adur-Anahid
- Boran
- Azarmidokht
- Denag

== Sources ==
- Baum, Wilhelm; Winkler, Dietmar W. (2003). The Church of the East: A Concise History. London-New York: Routledge-Curzon. ISBN 9781134430192.
