= Darigan =

- Military leader: Hazarbed
- Political leader: Sasanian king
- Allegiance: Sasanian Empire
- Headquarters: Sasanian Royal Palace
- Active regions: Sasanian Empire
- Part of: Sasanian Empire

The Darigan, was a special military force within the armed forces of the Sasanian Empire. This force (alongside the pushtigban) was charged with the protection of the Sasanian Emperor. The members of the Darigan were chosen from the various noble and significant families within the empire. Members of the Darigan were charged with tasks such as guarding the gates of the palace, presenting guests and foreign leaders to the ruler, and occasionally acted as military advisors or diplomats to the King.

== Notable operations ==
The commander of the Darigan (the Hazarbed) occasionally acted as a royal executioner and the Darigan would play a role in those operations. Additionally, on the holidays of Nowruz and Mihragan the King would often make a large speech; it was during this speech that the Darigan was given the task of protecting the King from potential plots during the events.
