= Aspad Gushnasp =

- Aspād-gušnasp
- Born: Gor, Ardashir-Khwarrah, Pars
- Died: after 628
- Military career
- Rank: Hazarbed of the Sasanian royal guard

Aspad Gushnasp (Persian: اسپد گشنسپ), known as Gousdanaspa in Byzantine sources, was an Iranian commander (hazarbed) of the Sasanian royal guard, who played a key role in the overthrow of the last great Sasanian king (shah) Khosrow II (r. 590–628) and the enthronement of the latter's son, Kavad II Sheroe.

== Biography ==
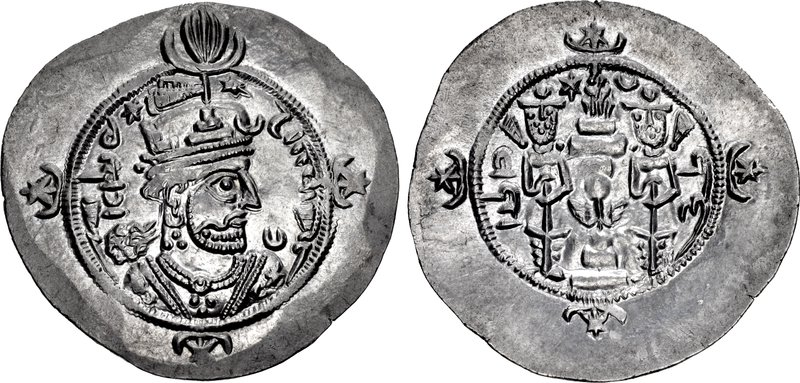
Coin of Kavad II Sheroe.

Aspad Gushnasp was native of Gor, a city in the district of Ardashir-Khwarrah in the Pars province. He was reportedly a foster brother of Sheroe. There are various versions of his name and title in several sources; his name is given as Asfad Jushnas by al-Tabari, and was the "head of an army division"; his name is given as Astad Kushnash by Ali ibn al-Athir; Yazdan Jushnas by Dinavari, who states that he was "chief of secretaries"; Asfad Jushnas by Bal'ami, who calls him one of the mehtarān-e dabīrān ("chief secretaries"); Asfad Gushnasb by al-Tha'alibi; Gousdanaspa in Byzantine sources, where he is often described as the leader or hazarbed of the Sasanian army, which seems more probable. What Aspad Gushnasp was called in his own day was Aspād-gušnasp, a Middle Persian name. The origins of the name is obscure, it is most probably not derived from the Parthian aspād ("army").

The office of hazarbed was given to reliable men, due to being the leader of the royal guard who protected the shah, and controlled the entrance of the shahs palace. This proved beneficial for Sheroe's plan to overthrow his father. On the night of 25 February, the night-watch of the Sasanian capital of Ctesiphon, which would usually shout the name of the reigning shah, shouted the name of Sheroe instead, which indicated a coup d'état was taking place. Sheroe, with Aspad Gushnasp leading his army, captured Ctesiphon and imprisoned Khosrow II in the house of a certain Mehr-Sepand (also spelled Maraspand). Sheroe, who had now assumed the dynastic name of Kavad II, then ordered Aspad Gushnasp to lead the charge of accusations against the deposed shah. Khosrow, however, dismissed all accusations one by one. Aspad Gushnasp was also later the main negotiator of the peace terms with the Byzantine emperor Heraclius. A few months later, a devastating plague swept through the western Sasanian provinces, killing half of its population including Kavad II. He was succeeded by his eight year old son Ardashir III, whilst Aspad Gushnasp was replaced by the powerful aristocrat Piruz Khosrow as hazarbed. Aspad Gushnasp's fate after that is unknown.

== Sources ==
- Pourshariati, Parvaneh (2008). Decline and Fall of the Sasanian Empire: The Sasanian-Parthian Confederacy and the Arab Conquest of Iran. London and New York: I.B. Tauris. ISBN 978-1-84511-645-3.
- Al-Tabari, Abu Ja'far Muhammad ibn Jarir (1999). Yar-Shater, Ehsan (ed.). The History of Al-Tabari: The Sasanids, the Lakhmids, and Yemen. Trans. David Waines. Albany, NY: State University of New York Press. ISBN 0-7914-0764-0.
- Tafazzoli, A. (1987). "Asfād Jošnas". Encyclopaedia Iranica, Vol. II, Fasc. 7. p. 743.
- Morony, Michael G. (2005) [1984]. Iraq After The Muslim Conquest. Gorgias Press LLC. ISBN 978-1-59333-315-7.
- Shahbazi, A. Shapur (2005). "SASANIAN DYNASTY". Encyclopaedia Iranica, Online Edition.

Unknown	Hazarbed of the royal Sasanian guard ??? – 6 September 628	Succeeded by Piruz Khosrow
