= Korymbos (headgear) =

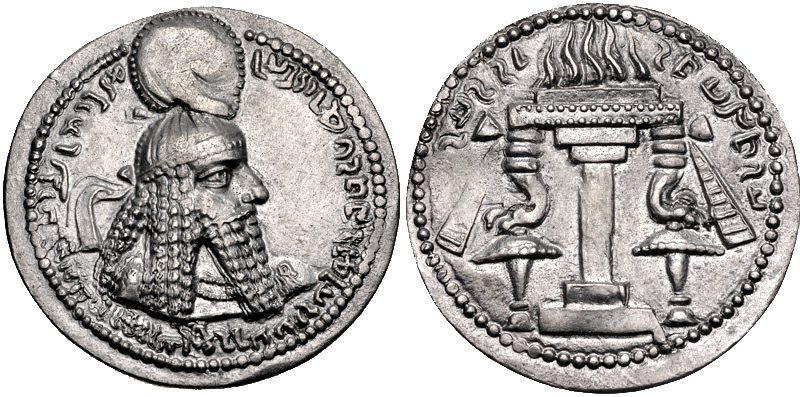
Coin of Ardashir I

The Korymbos (Greek: Κόρυμβος, Latin: Corymbus; both meaning "cluster" or "uppermost points") was a jewel-studded globe containing the top hair of the ruler of the Sasanian dynasty of Iran, resting on his crown. It was introduced by Ardashir I (r. 224–242). The art historian Matthew P. Canepa notes that although the Greek word Korymbos or Latin Corymbus has become a scholarly convention to refer to the spherical shape on the top of Sasanian crowns, it is not an indigenous Iranian term.

== Sources ==
- Canepa, Matthew P. (2009). The Two Eyes of the Earth: Art and Ritual of Kingship Between Rome and Sasanian Iran. University of California Press. ISBN 978-0520257276.
- Shahbazi, A. Shapur (2005). "Sasanian dynasty". In Yarshater, Ehsan (ed.). Encyclopædia Iranica (Online ed.). Encyclopædia Iranica Foundation.
