= Battle of Sarus =

Battle fought in 625

- Part of the Byzantine–Sasanian War of 602–628
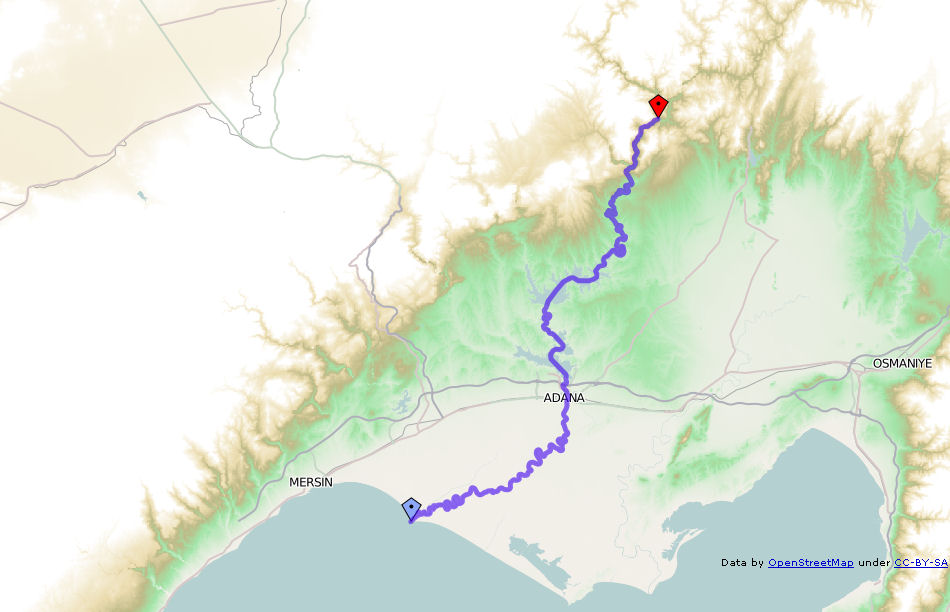
- Seyhan river (map)
Date	April 625
Location	Sarus river, Cilicia (modern-day Turkey)
Result	Byzantine victory

Belligerents
Byzantine Empire	Sasanian Empire

Commanders and leaders
Heraclius	Shahrbaraz

Strength
Unknown	Unknown but possibly larger force

Casualties and losses
Unknown	Unknown

The Battle of Sarus was fought in April 625 between the Byzantine army, led by Emperor Heraclius, and the Persian general Shahrbaraz. After a series of maneuvers, the Byzantine army under Heraclius, which in the previous year had invaded Persia, caught up with Shahrbaraz's army, which was heading towards the Byzantine capital, Constantinople, where his forces would take part in its siege together with the Avars. The battle ended in a nominal victory for the Byzantines, but Shahrbaraz withdrew in good order, and was able to continue his advance through Anatolia towards Constantinople.

== Sources ==
- Howard-Johnston, James (2006). East Rome, Sasanian Persia And the End of Antiquity: Historiographical And Historical Studies. Ashgate Publishing. ISBN 0-86078-992-6.
- Greatrex, Geoffrey (1991). The Roman Eastern Frontier and the Persian wars.Part II.363-630AD. Routledge. ISBN 0-415-14687-9.
