= Shahran-Guraz =

Fictional character in Persian poetry

Shahran Goraz (Persian: شهران‌گراز) is a character in Shahnameh. he is father of Hormizd and he approbated with coronation of Bahram Chobin.

== See also ==
- Shahrbaraz
