= Hormizd VI =

Hormizd VI 𐭠𐭥𐭧𐭥𐭬𐭦𐭣
- King of Kings of Iranians and non-Iranians
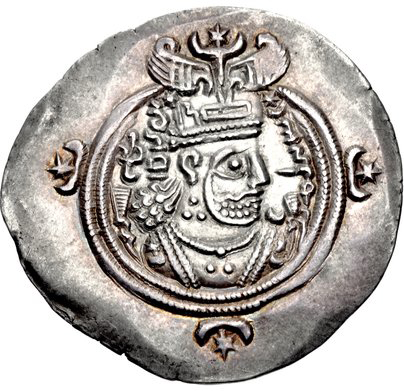
- Drachma of Hormizd VI

Shahanshah of the Sasanian Empire
- Reign: 630–632
- Predecessor: Shapur-i Shahrvaraz
- Successor: Yazdegerd III
- Died: 632
- Religion: Zoroastrianism

Hormizd VI (Middle Persian: 𐭠𐭥𐭧𐭥𐭬𐭦𐭣) was a Sasanian prince who ruled from 630 to 632.

The overthrow and execution of his grandfather Khosrow II (r. 590–628) in 628 led to a civil war that saw many pretenders to the Sasanian throne. This period saw a series of monarchs with very short reigns, often of less than a year. Before Hormizd VI, Shapur-i Shahrvaraz had a short reign, before he was deposed by powerful magnate Farrukh Hormizd. He then raised the Sasanian princess Azarmidokht to the throne in Ctesiphon in 630. Shortly after, the troops of prominent Sasanian general and usurper Shahrbaraz proclaimed Hormizd VI to be king in Nisibis.

He maintained himself about two years in Nisibis, until he was overthrown by the same troops who had previously supported him. Yazdegerd III, another grandson of Khosrow II, with the support of the nobles, succeeded in becoming the sole ruler of the empire.

== Sources ==
- Shahbazi, A. Shapur (2004). "Hormozd V". Encyclopaedia Iranica, Vol. XII, Fasc. 5. pp. 467–469.

Hormizd VI Sasanian dynasty
Preceded by Shapur-i Shahrvaraz	King of Kings of Iran and non-Iran; 630–632	Succeeded by Yazdegerd III
