= Khosrow IV =

- King of Kings of Iranians and non-Iranians
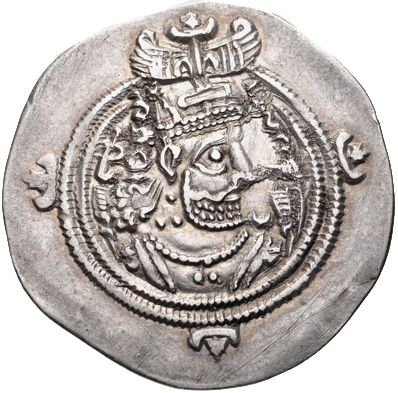

Rival Shahanshah of the Sasanian Empire
- Reign: 632–642
- Predecessor: Yazdegerd III
- Successor: Yazdegerd III
- Born: Jahrom (?)
- Died: after 642
- House: House of Sasan
- Father: Khosrow II
- Religion: Zoroastrianism

Khosrow IV (Middle Persian: 𐭧𐭥𐭮𐭫𐭥𐭣𐭩) was a claimant to the throne of the Sasanian Empire from 632 to 642, overlapping with the first decade of the reign of Yazdegerd III (r. 632–651).

== Etymology ==
Khosrow IV's full name was Farrokhzad Khosrow. "Farrokhzad" is a combination of farrokh ("endowed with light") and zād ("born"), meaning "born luminous (i.e., endowed with farnah [divine glory/splendor])". "Khosrow" is derived from Avestan hu-sravah ("of good reputation, renowned").

== Biography ==
Khosrow IV was reportedly a son of Khosrow II (r. 590–590, 591–628) and possibly from Jahrom in the Pars province. He had been hiding at the "Stone Fortress" close to Nisibis after Kavad II (r. 628) killed his brothers and seized power in 628. Later, Khosrow IV was put in power at the Sasanian capital of Ctesiphon. He was a claimant to the throne from 632 to 642, overlapping with the first decade of the reign of Yazdegerd III (r. 632–651).

According to the Shahnameh, Khosrow IV was in power for a month, while other texts from the Islamic era consider him to have ruled for a year. Both are these claims are contradicted by numerical evidence. Coins previously attributed to a certain Khosrow V are now identified as belonging to Khosrow IV.

Coin mints of Khosrow IV have been identified in Meshan, Garm-Kerman, Narmashir, Shiraz, Bishapur, Ardashir-Khwarrah, Darabgerd, Ctesiphon/moving royal camp, Weh-Kawad or Gundeshapur and possibly Abarshahr. According to the Iranologist Touraj Daryaee: "If we place these coins in the context of the Arab-Muslim conquest and the coinage of the last Sasanian ruler, Yazdegerd III, we can see a much more complicated picture of the 630s for the Sasanian political map."

Following the collapse of the Sasanian Empire in 651, people continued to use the coins minted under Khosrow IV. These coins featured a modification on its edges, where the Arabic word jayyid was now included to translate the Middle Persian word "prosperous/excellent".

== Sources ==
- Daryaee, Touraj (2026). "Ḵosrow IV". In Yarshater, Ehsan (ed.). Encyclopædia Iranica (Online ed.). Encyclopædia Iranica Foundation. ISSN 2330-4804.
- Gignoux, Philippe (1986). Iranisches Personennamenbuch II, fasc. 2: Noms propres sassanides en moyen-perse épigraphique (in French). Austrian Academy of Sciences. ISBN 978-3700132080.

Khosrow IV Sasanian dynasty
Preceded by Yazdegerd III	King of Kings of Iran; 632–642	Succeeded by Yazdegerd III
