= Shapur-i Shahrvaraz =

Shapur-i Shahrvaraz 𐭱𐭧𐭯𐭥𐭧𐭥𐭩𐭩 𐭧𐭱𐭨𐭥𐭥𐭥𐭰
- King of Kings of Iranians and non-Iranians

Shahanshah of the Sasanian Empire
- Reign: 630
- Predecessor: Boran
- Successor: Azarmidokht (in Ctesiphon); Hormizd VI (in Nisibis)
- House: House of Mihran
- Father: Shahrbaraz
- Mother: Unnamed sister of Khosrow II
- Religion: Zoroastrianism

Shapur-i Shahrvaraz (Middle Persian: 𐭱𐭧𐭯𐭥𐭧𐭥𐭩𐭩 𐭧𐭱𐭨𐭥𐭥𐭥𐭰, meaning "Shapur, son of Shahrvaraz"), also known as Shapur V, was Sasanian king (shah) of Iran briefly in 630.

== Biography ==
Shapur-i Shahrvaraz was the son of Shahrbaraz, the distinguished Iranian military commander (spahbed) and briefly shah of Iran. Shapur's mother was the sister of Khosrow II. In 630, after Boran was deposed, Shapur became king of Iran, but was shortly deposed by the nobles who did not acknowledge his rule. He was succeeded by his cousin Azarmidokht. When she became queen of Iran, Farrukh Hormizd proposed to marry her, which Shapur was in favor of; however, Azarmidokht declined the proposal and became angry at Shapur for agreeing. What happened to Shapur afterward is not known.

== Sources ==
- Pourshariati, Parvaneh (2008). Decline and Fall of the Sasanian Empire: The Sasanian-Parthian Confederacy and the Arab Conquest of Iran. London and New York: I.B. Tauris. ISBN 978-1-84511-645-3.

Shapur-i Shahrvaraz Sasanian dynasty
Preceded by Boran; Shahrbaraz in Nisibis	King of Kings of Iran and non-Iran; 630	Succeeded by Azarmidokht; Hormizd VI (in Nisibis)
