= Veh-Kavat =

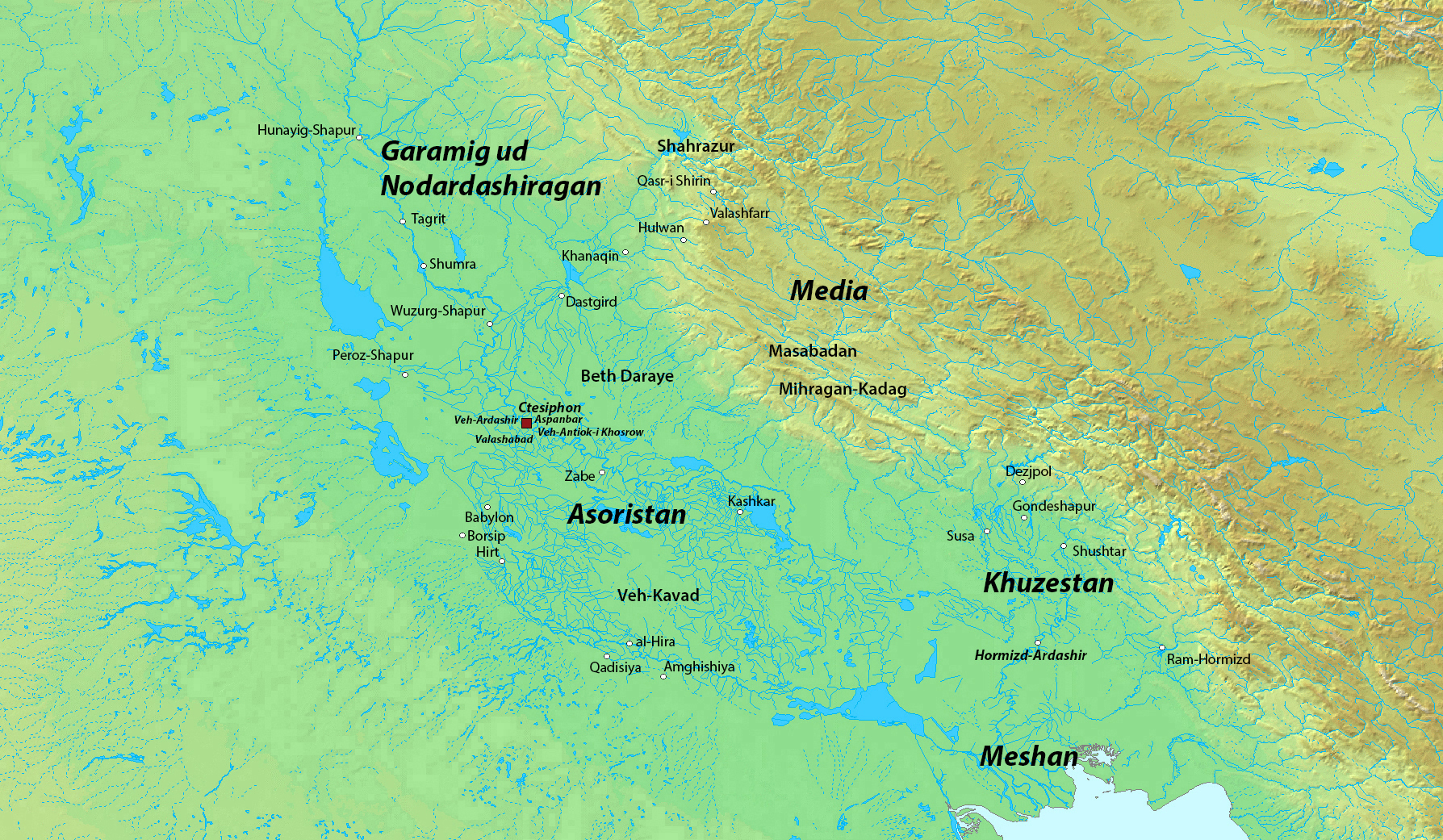
Map of the southwestern part of the Sasanian Empire.

Veh-Kavat (also spelled Veh-Kavadh), known in Islamic sources as Bih-Qubadh, was an administrative district within the Sasanian province of Asuristan and is known to have survived the Arab conquest of the Sasanian Empire and existed as a district until the 9th century AD at the least.

It encompassed all of today's cities of Najaf and Kufa in Iraq.

== Sources ==
- Morony, Michael G. (2005) [1984]. Iraq After The Muslim Conquest. Gorgias Press LLC. ISBN 978-1-59333-315-7.
- Morony, Michael (1989). "BEH-QOBĀD". Encyclopaedia Iranica, Vol. IV, Fasc. 1. p. 109.
