= Peroz II =

Peroz II (Middle Persian: 𐭯𐭩𐭫𐭥𐭰, Persian: پیروز دوم), also known as Gushnasp-Bandeh, was king of Persia. He was son of Mah-Adhur Gushnasp and Kahar-dukht, who was daughter of Yazdandad son of Khosrau I. Peroz II reigned only for a short time in 630 CE, until he was killed by Sasanian nobles.

Peroz II Sassanid dynasty
Preceded by Borandukht	Great King (Shah) of Persia; 630	Succeeded by Azarmidokht
