= Hazarbed =

Sassanid army rank

Hazārbed (Middle Persian: ḥčʾlpt, or hazarbadh, literally "the commander of thousand"), also known as hazaruft/hazaraft (Middle Persian: hz’lwpt; possibly the older/original form), was a Sasanian office which initially functioned as the commander of the royal guard, but later became increasingly equal to that of the wuzurg framadar (minister).

== History ==
The title is first attested in the Achaemenid Empire in its Old Persian form, hazāra-pati (from *hazāra- "thousand" and *pati- "chief"), the commanding officer of the Immortals.

The hazarbed controlled units of guards which were enlisted from royal families of the Sasanian Empire. One of the units that the hazarbed controlled was the pushtigban bodyguard, while other times it would be the palace guards (darigan), or in some cases other units, such as the 4,000 Daylamite guard which served the last great Sasanian king, Khosrow II (r. 590–628). The hazarbed was in charge of the king's safety and the commander of the royal guard. The hazarbed also controlled the entrance of the kings palace, presented visitors to the king, and was allowed to be given military command or used in negotiations. The hazarbed was also allowed in some cases to serve as the royal executioner.

During the reign of Shapur I (r. 240–270), the hazarbed may have briefly taken over the spahbed office, as it is not listed in the inscriptions of Shapur I. However, the spahbed office reappears in the inscriptions of Shapur's son Narseh (r. 293–302). The office of hazarbed is also mentioned in his inscriptions among many others.

Later on, the office became increasingly political and equal to that of the wuzurg framadar (minister).

== List ==
- Aspad Gushnasp

== See also ==
- Chiliarch
- Azarethes, the Latin name of whom is probably a corruption of this title (hazaraft)

== Sources ==
- Shayegan, M. Rahim (2003). "HAZĀRBED". Encyclopaedia Iranica, Vol. XII, Fasc. 1. pp. 93–95.
- Morony, Michael G. (2005) [1984]. Iraq After The Muslim Conquest. Gorgias Press LLC. ISBN 978-1-59333-315-7.
