= Khosrow III =

Khosrow III 𐭧𐭥𐭮𐭫𐭥𐭣𐭩
- King of Kings of Iranians and non-Iranians
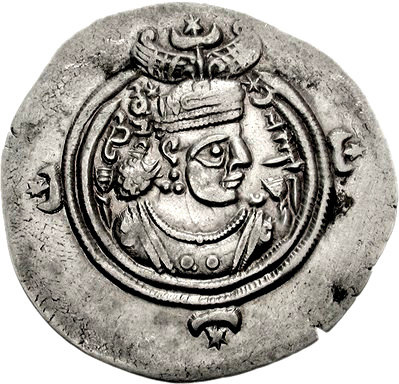

Rival Shahanshah of the Sasanian Empire
- Reign: 630
- Predecessor: Shahrbaraz
- Successor: Boran
- Died: 630; Khorasan
- House: House of Sasan
- Father: Khosrow II
- Religion: Zoroastrianism

Khosrow III (also spelled Khosrau, Khusro or Xosrow; Middle Persian: 𐭧𐭥𐭮𐭫𐭥𐭣𐭩; New Persian: خسرو) was a Sasanian rival claimant who briefly ruled a part of Khorasan for a few months in 630.

== Name ==
"Khosrow" is the New Persian variant of his name used by scholars; his original name was Middle Persian, Husraw, itself derived from Avestan Haosrauuah ("he who has good fame"). The name is transliterated in Greek as Chosroes (Χοσρόης) and in Arabic as Kisra.

== Biography ==
The background of Khosrow III is obscure; in some sources he has been described as a son of Kavad II (r. 628–628), whilst other state that he was a son of Khosrow II (r. 590–628). The latter seems more likely according to the English historian C. E. Bosworth. Khosrow III originally lived in the "land of the Turks", but after hearing of the friction in Iran, went to the country and succeeded in ruling some of Khorasan for three months, before being killed by its governor. On his coinage, Khosrow III is portrayed wearing the same crown as Khosrow II, with the two wings being a reference to Verethragna, the god of victory. He is portrayed without a beard on his portrait on the front, making him along with Ardashir III (r. 628–630) the only Sasanian monarchs without a beard.

== Sources ==
- Al-Tabari, Abu Ja'far Muhammad ibn Jarir (1985–2007). Ehsan Yar-Shater (ed.). The History of Al-Ṭabarī. Vol. V. Albany, NY: State University of New York Press. ISBN 978-0-7914-4355-2.
- Nicholson, Oliver; Canepa, Matthew; Daryaee, Touraj (2018). "Khosrow I Anoshirvan". In Nicholson, Oliver (ed.). The Oxford Dictionary of Late Antiquity. Oxford: Oxford University Press. ISBN 978-0-19-866277-8.
- Schindel, Nikolaus (2013). "Sasanian Coinage". In Potts, Daniel T. (ed.). The Oxford Handbook of Ancient Iran. Oxford University Press. ISBN 978-0199733309.
- Skjærvø, Prods Oktor (2000). "Kayāniān vii. Kauui Haosrauuah, Kay Husrōy, Kay Ḵosrow". Encyclopaedia Iranica.

Khosrow III Sasanian dynasty
Preceded by Shahrbaraz	Rival King of Kings of Iran and non-Iran; 630	Succeeded by Boran
