= Shahrbaraz =

Shah of the Sasanian Empire in 630

- King of Kings of Iranians and non-Iranians
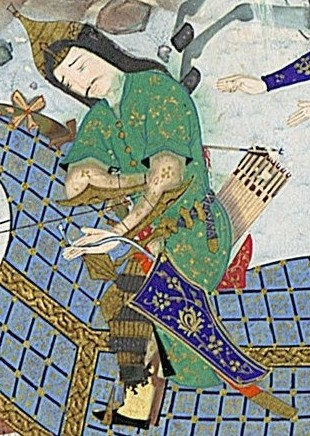
- Illustration of Shah Farain Guraz (Shahrbaraz). From the Shahnameh of Shah Tahmasp, dated 1530–1535

Shahanshah of the Sasanian Empire
- Reign: 27 April 630 – 9 June 630
- Predecessor: Ardashir III
- Successor: Boran (in Ctesiphon); Khosrow III (in Khorasan)
- Died: 9 June 630; Ctesiphon
- Spouse: Mirhran
- Issue: Niketas; Shapur-i Shahrvaraz; Nike
- House: House of Mihran
- Father: Ardashir
- Religion: Zoroastrianism

Shahrbaraz (also spelled Shahrvaraz or Shahrwaraz; New Persian: شهربراز) was King of Kings of the Sasanian Empire from 27 April 630 to 9 June 630. He usurped the throne from Ardashir III, and was killed by Iranian nobles after forty days. Before usurping the Sasanian throne he was a spahbed (general) under Khosrow II (590–628). He is furthermore noted for his important role during the climactic Byzantine–Sasanian War of 602–628, and the events that followed afterwards.

== Name ==
Shahrbaraz is actually a title, literally meaning "the Boar of the Empire", attesting to his dexterity in military command and his warlike personality, as the boar was the animal associated with the Zoroastrian Yazata Vahram, the epitome of victory. Shahrwarāz (Inscriptional Pahlavi: 𐭱𐭲𐭫𐭥𐭫𐭠𐭰 štlwlʾc) is a Middle Persian word, with shahr meaning "country" and warāz meaning "boar". This word is rendered as Shahrbarāz (شهربراز) in New Persian and as Sarvaros (Greek: Σαρβάρος; Latin: Sarbarus) in Byzantine sources. Ferdowsi has used the shortened form Gurāz (گراز, literally "boar"), which is from Middle Persian warāz.

According to al-Tabari, his real name was Farrukhān (فرخان). The name is corrupted as Khoream in Armenian sources and Farāyīn (فرایین) in Ferdowsi's Shahnama. Ferdowsi has split Shahrbaraz's character into two: Farayin who was the usurper, and Shahran-Guraz who supported Bahram Chobin's rebellion.

Armenian sources also use the title Razmyozan (also spelled Razmiozan, Erazmiozan, Razmayuzan). The title is also mentioned as Rasmiozdan, Rasmiozan (Georgian), rsmysa (Arabic: رسميسة, reading uncertain), Rōmēzān, Rūmīzān, Rumbūzān (al-Tabari, Tarikh).

== Early life ==
Shahrbaraz belonged to the House of Mihran, one of the Seven Parthian clans; he was the son of a certain Ardashir. During Shahrbaraz's later life, he joined the Sasanian army, where he rose to high offices, and was appointed as spahbed of Nēmrōz. He was married to the sister of the Sasanian king Khosrow II, Mirhran, with whom Shahrbaraz had one boy named Shapur-i Shahrvaraz. Shahrbaraz also had another son named Niketas the Persian, who may be from the same woman or from another.

== War against the Byzantine Empire ==
Shahrbaraz is first mentioned when Khosrow II started the last and most devastating of the Byzantine–Sasanian wars, which lasted 26 years. Khosrow II, along with Shahrbaraz and his other best generals, conquered Dara and other cities in 604, and in the north, the Byzantines were driven back to the old, pre-591 frontier before Khosrow II gave them most of Sasanian Armenia, parts of Mesopotamia and western half of the Kingdom of Iberia. After reconquering lost territory, Khosrow II withdrew from the battlefield and handed military operations to his best generals. Shahrbaraz was one of them. In 610, Heraclius, an Armenian of probable Arsacid descent, revolted against the Byzantine Emperor Phocas and killed him, crowning himself as Emperor of the Byzantine Empire. After becoming Byzantine Emperor, he prepared a major counter-attack against the Sasanians outside Antioch in 613, but was decisively defeated by Shahrbaraz, who inflicted heavy losses on the Byzantine army and then captured the city, giving the Sasanians naval access to the Mediterranean Sea.

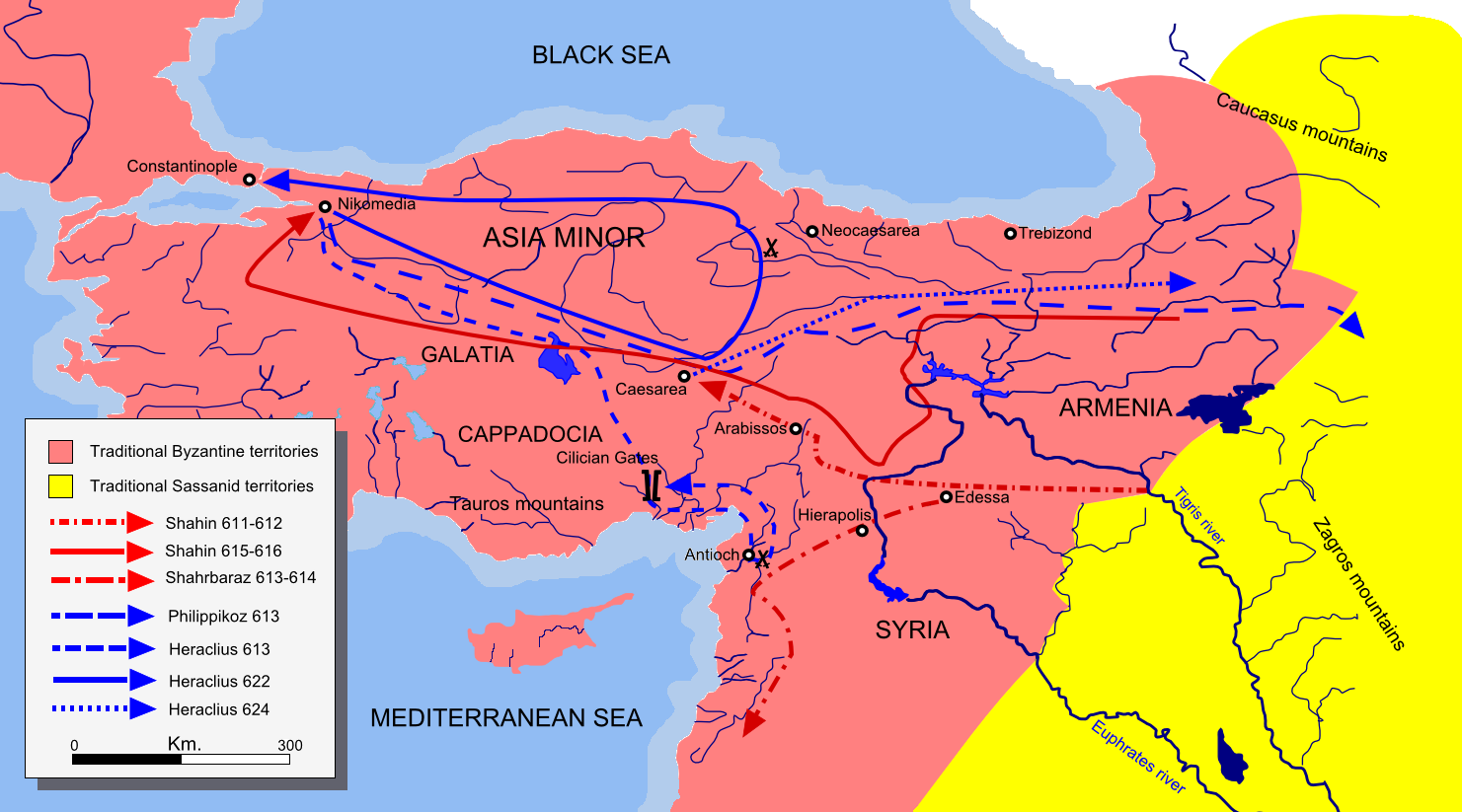
Campaign map from 611 to 624 through Syria, Anatolia, Armenia, and Mesopotamia.

After the Byzantine defeat outside Antioch, Heraclius and his brother Theodore, along with General Nicetas, combined their armies in Syria, but were defeated by Shahrbaraz and his forces who besieged Damascus and captured it along with a large number of Byzantine troops as prisoners. Furthermore, Shahrbaraz also defeated a Byzantine army near Adhri'at. One of the most important events during his career was when he led the Sasanian army towards Palaestina, and after a bloody siege captured Jerusalem, a city sacred to the Christians. After his conquest of Jerusalem the Holy Cross was carried away in triumph. In 618, Shahrbaraz was ordered by Khosrow II to invade Egypt, and by 619, Alexandria, the capital of Byzantine Egypt, was in Sasanian hands.

After the fall of Alexandria, Shahrbaraz and his forces extended Sasanian rule southwards along the Nile. By 621, the province was securely in Sasanian hands, and a certain Sahralanyozan was appointed as its governor. In 622, Heraclius counter-attacked against the Sasanian Empire in Anatolia. Shahrbaraz was sent over there to deal with him, but was eventually defeated by him.

After Heraclius' victory, he marched towards Caucasian Albania and wintered there. Shahrbaraz, along with Shahin and Shahraplakan were later sent by the orders of Khosrow II to trap the forces of Heraclius. Shahin managed to rout the Byzantine army. Due to jealousy between the Sasanian commanders, Shahrbaraz hurried with his army to take part in the glory of the victory. Heraclius met them at Tigranakert and routed the forces of Shahraplakan and Shahin one after the other. After this victory, Heraclius crossed the Araxes and camped in the plains on the other side. Shahin, with the remnants of both his and Shahraplakan's armies joined Shahrbaraz in the pursuit of Heraclius, but marshes slowed them down. At Aliovit, Shahrbaraz split his forces, sending some 6,000 troops to ambush Heraclius while the remainder of the troops stayed at Aliovit. Heraclius launched a surprise night attack on the Sasanian main camp in February 625, destroying it. Shahrbaraz only barely escaped, naked and alone, having lost his harem, baggage, and men.

Heraclius spent the rest of winter to the north of Lake Van. In 625, his forces attempted to push back towards the Euphrates. In a mere seven days, he bypassed Mount Ararat and the 200 miles along the Arsanias River to capture Amida and Martyropolis, important fortresses on the upper Tigris. Heraclius then carried on towards the Euphrates, pursued by Shahrbaraz. According to Arab sources, he was stopped at the Satidama or Batman Su River and defeated; Byzantine sources, however, do not mention this incident. Another minor skirmish between Heraclius and Shahrbaraz took place at the Sarus river near Adana. Shahrbaraz stationed his forces across the river from the Byzantines. A bridge spanned the river, and the Byzantines immediately charged across. Shahrbaraz feigned retreat to lead the Byzantines into an ambush, and the vanguard of Heraclius' army was destroyed within minutes. The Sasanians, however, had neglected to cover the bridge, and Heraclius charged across with the rearguard, unafraid of the arrows that the Sasanians shot, turning the tide of battle against the Sasanians. Shahrbaraz expressed his admiration at Heraclius to a renegade Greek: "See your Emperor! He fears these arrows and spears no more than would an anvil!" The Battle of Sarus was a successful retreat for the Byzantines that panegyrists magnified. In the aftermath of the battle, the Byzantine army wintered at Trebizond.

== Siege of Constantinople ==
Shahrbaraz, along with a smaller army, later managed to slip through Heraclius' flanks and bee-lined for Chalcedon, the Sasanian base across the Bosphorus from Constantinople. Khosrow II coordinated with the Khagan of the Avars so as to launch a coordinated attack on Constantinople from both European and Asiatic sides. The army of Shahrbaraz stationed themselves at Chalcedon, while the Avars placed themselves on the European side of Constantinople and destroyed the Aqueduct of Valens. Because of the Byzantine navy's control of the Bosphorus strait, however, the Sasanians could not send troops to the European side to aid their ally. This reduced the effectiveness of the siege, because the Sasanians were experts in siege warfare. Furthermore, the Sasanians and Avars had difficulties communicating across the guarded Bosphorus—though undoubtedly, there was some communication between the two forces.

Map of the environs of Constantinople in Byzantine times.

On 7 August, a fleet of Sasanian rafts ferrying troops across the Bosphorus was surrounded and destroyed by Byzantine ships. The Slavs under the Avars attempted to attack the sea walls from across the Golden Horn, while the main Avar host attacked the land walls. Patrician Bonus' galleys rammed and destroyed the Slavic boats; the Avar land assault from 6 to 7 August also failed. With the news that Theodore had decisively triumphed over Shahin (supposedly leading Shahin to die from depression), the Avars retreated to the Balkan hinterland within two days, never to threaten Constantinople seriously again. Even though the army of Shahrbaraz was still encamped at Chalcedon, the threat to Constantinople was over.

Disappointed by Shahrbaraz's failure, Khosrow II sent a messenger bearing a letter to Kardarigan, who was the second-in-command of the Sasanian army. The letter said that Kardarigan should kill Shahrbaraz and take his army back to Ctesiphon, but the bearers of the letter were intercepted in Galatia by Byzantine soldiers, who gave the letter to the future emperor Constantine III who in turn gave it to Heraclius. After reading the letter, he offered to show the letter to Shahrbaraz in a meeting at Constantinople. Shahrbaraz accepted his proposal and met Heraclius at Constantinople, where he read the letter and switched over to Heraclius' side. Shahrbaraz then changed the contents of the letter, making it state that Khosrow II wanted 400 officers killed, ensuring that Kardarigan and the rest of the army remained loyal to him.

Shahrbaraz then moved his army to northern Syria, where he could easily decide to support either Khosrow or Heraclius at a moment's notice. Still, with the neutralization of Khosrow's most skilled general, Heraclius deprived his enemy of some of his best and most experienced troops, while securing his flanks prior to his invasion of Iran.

== Overthrow of Khosrow II ==
In 627, Khosrow sent Shahrbaraz a letter, which said that he should send his army to Ctesiphon. Shahrbaraz, however, disobeyed, and moved to Asuristan, where he set up a camp in Ardashir Khurrah. Khosrow then sent Farrukhzad to negotiate with him. However, Farrukhzad made a secret conspiracy against Khosrow and joined Shahrbaraz.

One year later, the feudal families of the Sasanian Empire, who were tired of war against the Byzantines and Khosrow's policies, freed Khosrow's son Sheroe, who had been imprisoned by his own father. The feudal families included: Shahrbaraz himself, who represented the Mihran family; the House of Ispahbudhan represented by spahbed Farrukh Hormizd and his two sons Rostam Farrokhzad and Farrukhzad; the Armenian faction represented by Varaztirots II Bagratuni; and finally the kanarang Kanadbak. In February, Sheroe, along with Aspad Gushnasp, captured Ctesiphon and imprisoned Khosrow II. Sheroe then proclaimed himself as king of the Sasanian Empire on 25 February, assuming the regnal name of Kavadh II. With the aid of Piruz Khosrow, he executed all his brothers and half-brothers, including Khosrow II's favorite son Mardanshah. Three days later, he ordered Mihr Hormozd to execute his father. With the agreement of the nobles of the Sasanian empire, Kavad II then made peace with the Byzantine emperor Heraclius; under the terms of this peace, the Byzantines regained all their lost territories, their captured soldiers, a war indemnity, along with the True Cross and other relics that were lost in Jerusalem in 614.

Following the loss of territory required for the peace treaty, the embittered aristocracy started forming independent states within the Sasanian Empire. This divided the resources of the country. Furthermore, dams and canals became derelict, and a devastating plague erupted in the western provinces of Iran, killing half of the population along with Kavad II, who was succeeded by Ardashir III.

== Usurping the throne ==
After the death of Kavad II, Heraclius sent Shahrbaraz a letter saying:

Now that the Iranian king is dead, the throne and the kingdom has come to you. I bestow it on you, and on your offspring after you. If an army is necessary, I shall send to your assistance as many [troops] as you may need.

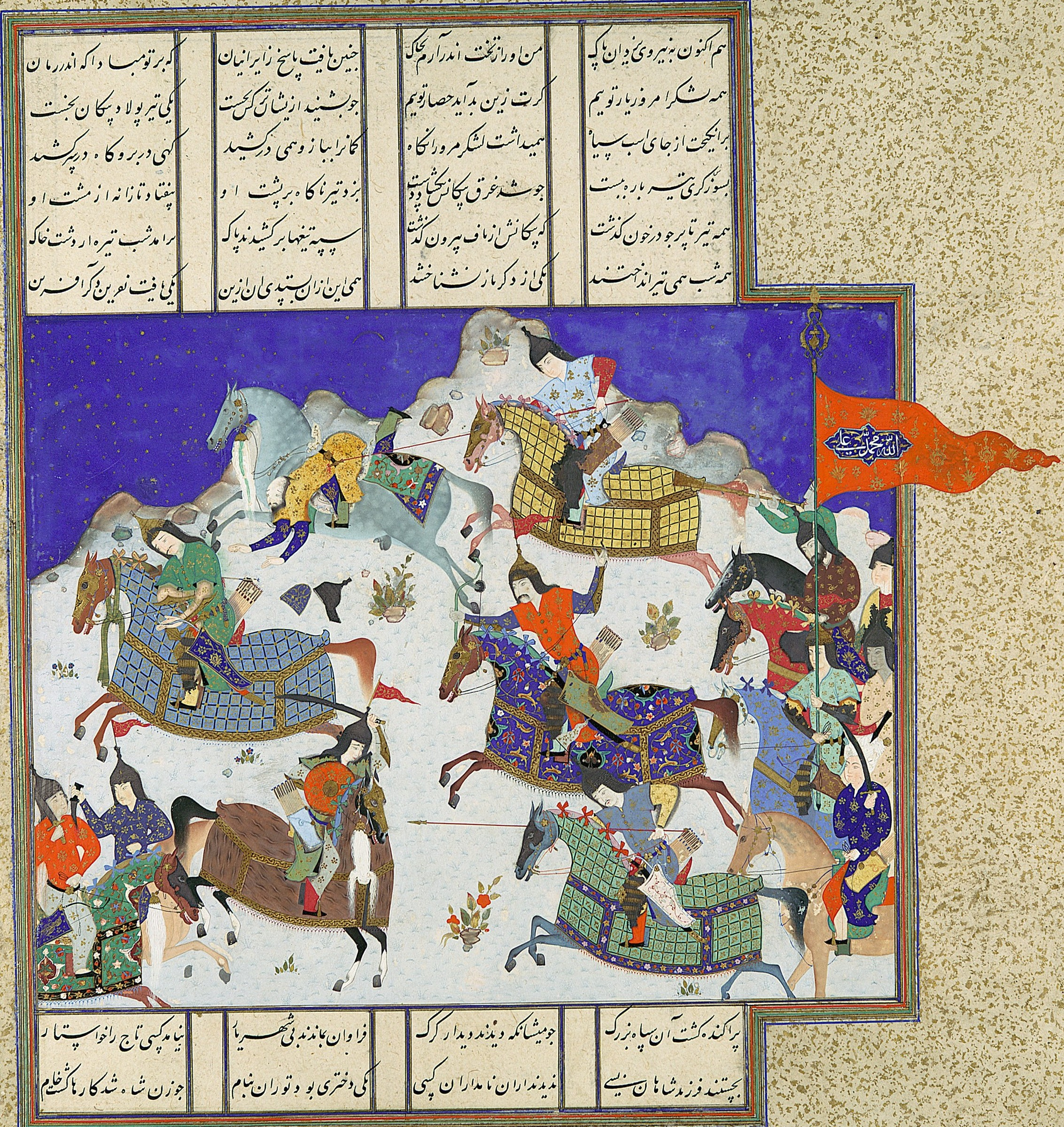
"The Coup against Usurper Shah", depicting Shahrbaraz's death by an arrow. From the Shahnameh of Shah Tahmasp, dated 1530–1535

On 27 April 630, Shahrbaraz besieged Ctesiphon with a force of 6,000 men. He was, however, unable to capture the city, and then made an alliance with Piruz Khosrow, the leader of the Parsig (Persian) faction, and the previous minister of the Empire during the reign of Ardashir's father, Kavad II. He also made an alliance with Namdar Gushnasp, who had succeeded him as the spahbed of Nēmrōz in 626. Shahrbaraz, with the aid of these two powerful figures, captured Ctesiphon, and executed Ardashir III along with many Sasanian nobles, including Ardashir's minister Mah-Adhur Gushnasp. Shahrbaraz then became the new shah (king) of the Sasanian Empire, and killed Kardarigan, who opposed Shahrbaraz after his usurpation of the Sasanian throne.

Heraclius also acknowledged Shahrbaraz's Christian son Niketas, as his heir. An Iranian Christian as the heir of the Sasanian Empire opened the chances of the Christianization of Iran. After some time, Shahrbaraz had Shamta, the son of the former financial minister Yazdin, crucified on a church in Margha. The reason of this execution was reportedly because the latter had insulted Shahrbaraz during the reign of Khosrow II. Forty days later, 9 June 630, during a ceremony, Shahrbaraz was killed by a javelin thrown by Farrukh Hormizd, who then helped Boran, the daughter of Khosrow II, to ascend the throne.

== Legacy ==
Shahrbaraz had played an important role in the Byzantine–Sasanian War of 602–628, and the events that occurred after the war; his mutiny against Khosrow II caused the Sasanian Empire to fall into a civil war. After the death of Shahrbaraz, his son Shapur-i Shahrvaraz deposed Boran and became king of the Sasanian Empire. His reign, however, did not last long, and he was shortly deposed by the Sasanian nobles. During the same period, Niketas entered in the service of the Byzantines, and would later appear as one of the Byzantine generals at the Battle of Yarmouk during the Arab–Byzantine wars.

A detailed saga of heroism and romance evolved around Shahrbaraz later. In the Islamic period, it was transferred into the legend of Umar ibn al-Numan and his sons which became included in the One Thousand and One Nights, itself influencing the late Byzantine epic of Digenes Akritas. In the Syriac Life of Simeon of the Olives, which takes place at the end of the seventh century, Sharbaraz appears anachronistically as ruler or "king of Sīrwān".

== General and cited sources ==
- Crawford, Peter (2013). The War of the Three Gods: Romans, Persians and the Rise of Islam. Pen and Sword. pp. 1–240. ISBN 978-1473828650.
- Dodgeon, Michael H.; Greatrex, Geoffrey; Lieu, Samuel N. C. (2002a). The Roman Eastern Frontier and the Persian Wars (Part I, 226–363 AD). Routledge. ISBN 0-415-00342-3.
- Dodgeon, Michael H.; Greatrex, Geoffrey; Lieu, Samuel N. C. (2002b). The Roman Eastern Frontier and the Persian Wars (Part II, 363–630 AD). Routledge. ISBN 0-415-00342-3.
- Howard-Johnston, James (2006). East Rome, Sasanian Persia and the End of Antiquity: Historiographical and Historical Studies. Ashgate Publishing. ISBN 0-86078-992-6.
- Jalalipour, Saeid (2014). Persian Occupation of Egypt 619–629: Politics and Administration of Sasanians (PDF). Sasanika. Archived from the original (PDF) on 26 May 2015.
- Kaegi, Walter Emil (2003). Heraclius: Emperor of Byzantium. Cambridge University Press. ISBN 0-521-81459-6.
- Martindale, John R.; Jones, A. H. M.; Morris, John (1992). The Prosopography of the Later Roman Empire – Volume III, AD 527–641. Cambridge University Press. ISBN 0-521-20160-8.
- Morony, Michael G. (2005) [1984]. Iraq After the Muslim Conquest. Gorgias Press LLC. ISBN 978-1-59333-315-7. Archived from the original on 5 May 2016.
- Norwich, John Julius (1997). A Short History of Byzantium. Vintage Books. ISBN 0-679-77269-3.
- Olster, David Michael (1993). The Politics of Usurpation in the Seventh Century: Rhetoric and Revolution in Byzantium. A.M. Hakkert.
- Oman, Charles (1893). Europe, 476–918, Volume 1. Macmillan.
- Payne, Richard E. (2015). A State of Mixture: Christians, Zoroastrians, and Iranian Political Culture in Late Antiquity. Univ of California Press. pp. 1–320. ISBN 9780520961531.
- Pourshariati, Parvaneh (2008). Decline and Fall of the Sasanian Empire: The Sasanian-Parthian Confederacy and the Arab Conquest of Iran. London and New York: I.B. Tauris. ISBN 978-1-84511-645-3.
- Shapur Shahbazi, A. (1990). "Byzantine-Iranian relations". Encyclopaedia Iranica, Vol. IV, Fasc. 6. pp. 588–599.
- Shapur Shahbazi, A. (2005). "Sasanian Dynasty". Encyclopaedia Iranica, Online Edition.
- Treadgold, Warren T. (1997). A History of the Byzantine State and Society. Stanford University Press. ISBN 0-8047-2630-2.

Shahrbaraz House of Mihran Died: June 630
Preceded by Ardashir III	King of Kings of Iran and non-Iran; 27 April 630 – 9 June 630	Succeeded by Boran (in Ctesiphon); Khosrow III (in Khorasan)
