= Azarmidokht =

Sasanian queen of Iran

- Queen of Queens of Iran
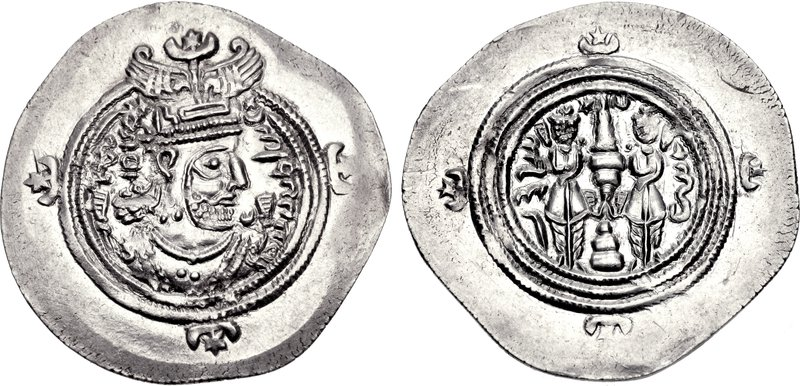
- Drachma of Azarmidokht with the bust of her father Khosrow II to the left

Queen of the Sasanian Empire
- Reign: 630–631
- Predecessor: Shapur-i Shahrvaraz
- Successor: Boran
- Died: 631; Ctesiphon
- House: House of Sasan
- Father: Khosrow II
- Religion: Zoroastrianism

Azarmidokht (Middle Persian: Āzarmīgdukht) was Sasanian queen (banbishn) of Iran from 630 to 631. She was the daughter of king (shah) Khosrow II (r. 590–628). She was the second Sasanian queen; her sister Boran ruled before and after her. Azarmidokht came to power in Iran after her cousin Shapur-i Shahrvaraz was deposed by the Parsig faction, led by Piruz Khosrow, who helped Azarmidokht ascend the throne. Her rule was marked by an attempt of a nobleman and commander Farrukh Hormizd to marry her and come to power. After the queen's refusal, he declared himself an anti-king. Azarmidokht had him killed as a result of a successful plot. She was, however, killed herself shortly afterwards by Rostam Farrokhzad in retaliation for his father's death. She was succeeded by Boran.

== Name ==
"Azarmidokht" is the New Persian variant of her name used by scholars; her original name was Middle Persian, Āzarmīgdukht, meaning "daughter of the respected one", referring to her father Khosrow II (r. 590–628).

== Background and early life ==
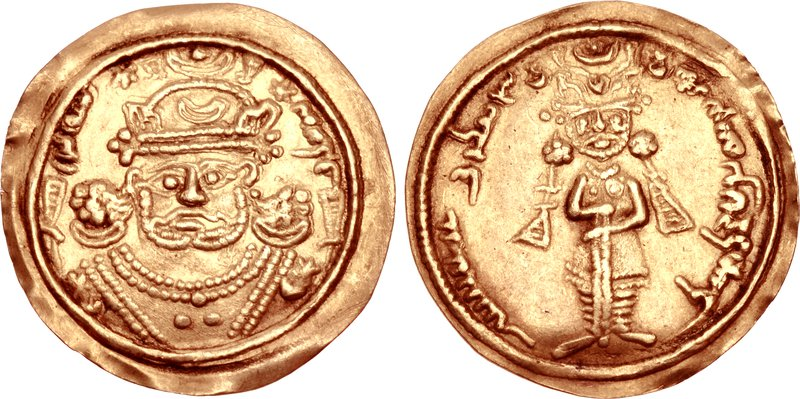
Gold dinar of Khosrow II

Azarmidokht was the daughter of the last prominent Sasanian shah of Iran, Khosrow II, who was overthrown and executed on 28 February 628 by his own son Kavad II, who proceeded to have all his brothers and half-brothers executed, including the heir Mardanshah. This dealt a heavy blow to the empire, which it would never recover from. Azarmidokht and her sister Boran reportedly criticized and scolded Kavad II for his barbaric actions, which caused him to become remorseful.

The fall of Khosrow II culminated in a civil war lasting four years, with the most powerful members of the nobility gaining full autonomy and starting to create their own government. The hostilities between the Persian (Parsig) and Parthian (Pahlav) noble-families were also resumed, which split up the wealth of the nation. A few months later, a devastating plague swept through the western Sasanian provinces, killing half of its population including Kavad II. He was succeeded by his about eight-year-old son Ardashir III, who was killed two years later by the distinguished Iranian general Shahrbaraz, who was in turn murdered forty-three days later in a coup by leader of the Pahlav, Farrukh Hormizd, who helped Boran ascend the throne. She was, however, the following year deposed and replaced with her cousin Shapur-i Shahrvaraz (who was also Shahrbaraz's son). His rule proved even more brief than that of his predecessor−being deposed after less than a year by the Parsig faction led by Piruz Khosrow, who helped Azarmidokht ascend the throne.

== Reign ==
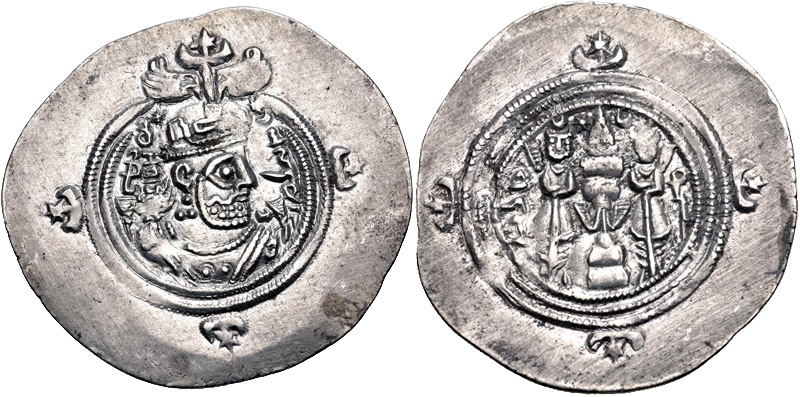
Drachma of Farrukh Hormizd

When Azarmidokht was made queen of Iran, she stated that the management of the country would be the same of her father, Khosrow II. Farrukh Hormizd, in order to strengthen his authority and create a modus vivendi between the Pahlav and Parsig, asked Azarmidokht (who was a Parsig nominee) to marry him. Azarmidokht, however, declined. After having his proposal declined, Farrukh Hormizd "no longer shied away from the throne itself", declaring "Today I am the leader of the people and the pillar of the country of Iran." He started minting coins in the same fashion as a monarch, notably in Istakhr in Pars and Nahavand in Media. In order to deal with Farrukh Hormizd, Azarmidokht supposedly allied herself with Mihranid dynast Siyavakhsh, who was the grandson of Bahram Chobin, the famous military commander (spahbed) and briefly shah of Iran. With Siyavakhsh's aid, Azarmidokht had Farrukh Hormizd killed.

Farrukh Hormizd's son Rostam Farrokhzad, who was at that time stationed in the northeastern region of Khorasan, succeeded him as the leader of the Pahlav. In order to avenge his father, he led troops to Ctesiphon, the capital of the Sasanian Empire, "defeating every army of Azarmidokht that he met". He then defeated Siyavakhsh's forces at Ctesiphon and captured the city. Azarmidokht was shortly afterwards blinded and killed by Rostam, who restored Boran to the throne. After this incident the center of power for the empire possibly drifted to the northeast, which was the homeland of the Pahlav, and was the area where Yazdegerd III, the last Sasanian king of kings, ultimately fled to seek aid against the Arab invasion of Iran.

== Coin mints and imperial ideology ==
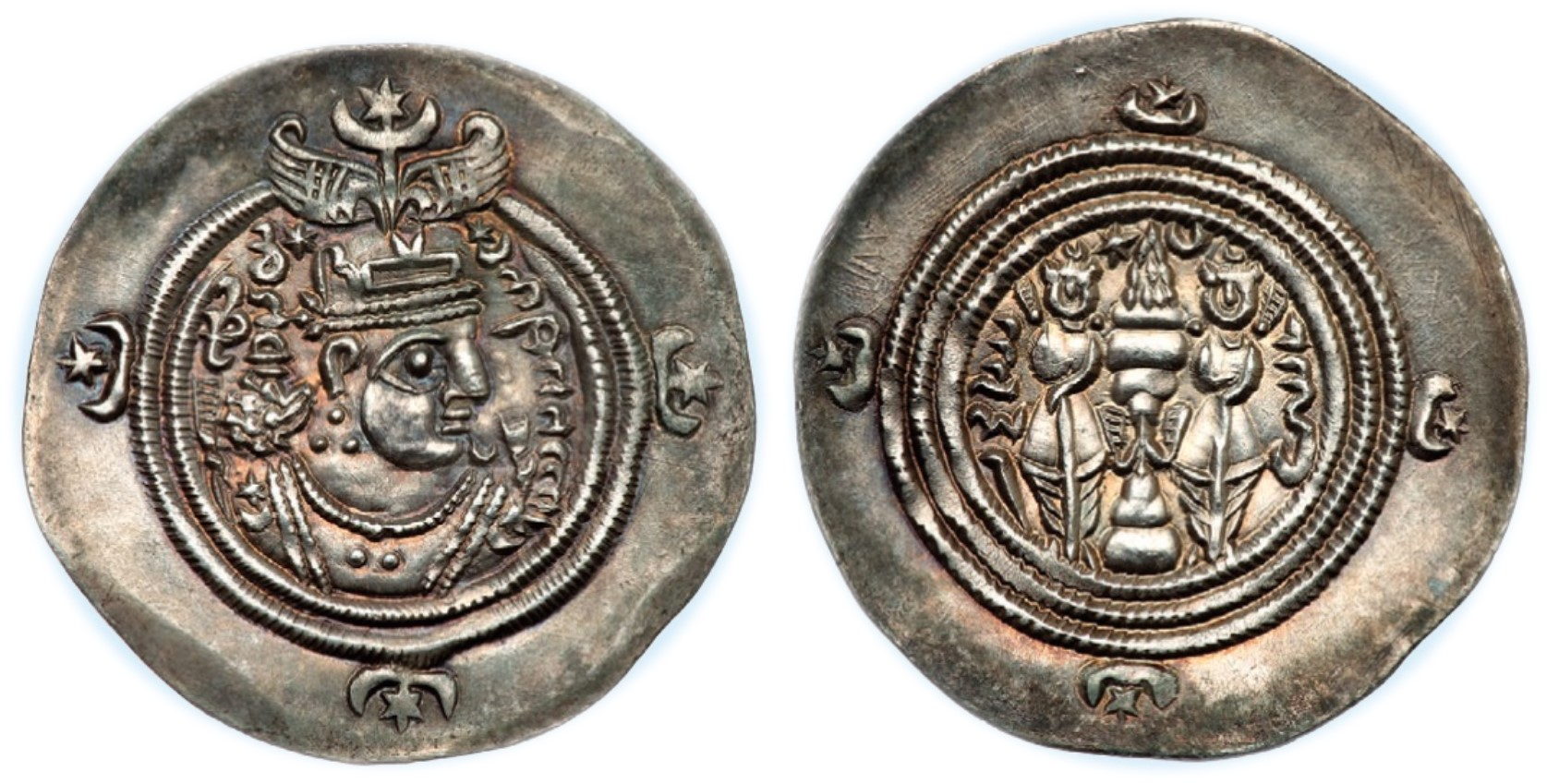
Drachma of Azarmidokht showing her own face to the left

Azarmidokht had coins minted in the same style as her father. The obverse showed a portrait of him, with the winged crown representing the god of victory Verethragna. The inscription contained the sentence khwarrah abzūd ("Increase in Glory"). On the reverse there are two custodians at a Sasanian fire-altar, a common depiction.

Her reason for putting her father was not due to her gender, but primarily to emphasize her legitimacy by relation to the royal Sasanian family, and most importantly to Khosrow II, who was considered the last rightful king of Iran. Azarmidokht's reason for minting coins with the image of her father was thus to restore his image and that of the Sasanian house, an attempt which was first made by Azarmidokht's sister, Boran, who did not however use an image of their father, but instead resorted to pay tribute to him by referring to him in her inscriptions. An inscription may have been inadequate during Azarmidokht's reign, hence the placement of Khosrow II's image on the obverse of the coins.

== Personality, appearance and accomplishments ==
Azarmidokht is depicted as beautiful and intelligent in Islamic accounts. According to the 10th-century historian Hamza al-Isfahani, the now lost book of Kitāb ṣuwar molūk Banī Sāsān ("The Sasanian picture book") portrayed her as "seated, wearing a red embroidered gown and sky-blue studded trousers, grasping a battle-axe in her right hand and leaning on a sword held in her left hand." The construction of a castle at Asadabad is attributed to her. Her title was "the Just."

== Sources ==
- Al-Tabari, Abu Ja'far Muhammad ibn Jarir (1985–2007). Ehsan Yar-Shater (ed.). The History of Al-Ṭabarī. Vol. 40 vols. Albany, NY: State University of New York Press.
- Daryaee, Touraj (2014). "The Last Ruling Woman of Iranshahr: Queen Azarmigduxt". International Journal of the Society of Iranian Archaeology. 1 (1).
- Gignoux, Ph. (1987). "Āzarmīgduxt". Encyclopaedia Iranica, Vol. III, Fasc. 2. p. 190.
- Howard-Johnston, James (2010). "Ḵosrow II". Encyclopaedia Iranica, Online Edition.
- Kia, Mehrdad (2016). The Persian Empire: A Historical Encyclopedia [2 volumes]: A Historical Encyclopedia. ABC-CLIO. ISBN 978-1610693912.
- Pourshariati, Parvaneh (2008). Decline and Fall of the Sasanian Empire: The Sasanian-Parthian Confederacy and the Arab Conquest of Iran. London and New York: I.B. Tauris. ISBN 978-1-84511-645-3.
- Shahbazi, A. Shapur (2005). "Sasanian dynasty". Encyclopaedia Iranica, Online Edition.

Azarmidokht Sasanian dynasty Died: 631
| Preceded by Shapur-i Shahrvaraz | Queen of Queens of Iran; 630–631 | Succeeded by Boran |
