= Plague of Sheroe =

Plague epidemic in Mesopotamia, 627–628 CE

The Plague of Sheroe of 627–628 CE (also called Sheroe's Plague) was an epidemic of the plague—the deadly contagious disease caused by the Yersinia pestis bacterium—that devastated the western regions of the Sasanian Empire and hastened its decline. The epidemic ravaged Mesopotamia, a populous and vital agricultural region that was also home to the imperial capital Ctesiphon. Estimates of the plague's lethality vary; some records indicate that it left over 100,000 dead in the capital alone. Among its victims was the reigning King of Kings (shahanshah) Kavad II, whose birth name was "Sheroe". Kavad himself succumbed to the disease in 628, just months after seizing the throne by murdering most of his family.

Sheroe's Plague was a major factor in the decline and fall of the Sasanian Empire. In 632 the Rashidun Caliphate would attack its plague-weakened Sasanian neighbor, and by 654 the Arab conquest of Persia was complete.

The Plague of Sheroe was one wave of the first plague pandemic which devastated the Old World from 541–767; the earliest of these was the widespread Plague of Justinian. The Y. pestis pathogen was likely introduced to Asoristan province (Sasanian Mesopotamia) by Persian armies returning from campaigns in Constantinople and the Byzantine-controlled regions of Syria and Armenia at the end of the last Byzantine war. Additional outbreaks of plague throughout the empire followed from 634 to 642 during the reign of Kavad's successor Yazdegerd III.

The Sasanian Empire was already unstable when the Plague of Sheroe struck—its ruling family decimated by Kavad's murderous ascendance, its treasury depleted by the costly Byzantine war, and its ruling elite gripped by factionalism that regularly erupted into revolts and civil war. Yazdegerd's installation on the throne was intended to bring stability to the empire; instead his reign was marked by regional uprisings, internecine warfare, more outbreaks of plague, and finally the Arab conquest in 654. He would be the last Sasanian King of Kings.

== See also ==
- First plague pandemic
- Plague of Justinian

== Sources ==
- Bray, R.S. (2020) [1996]. Armies of Pestilence: The Impact of Pandemics on History. The Lutterworth Press. ISBN 978-0-7188-9560-0.
- Christensen, Peter (1993). The Decline of Iranshahr: Irrigation and Environments in the History of the Middle East, 500 B.C. to A.D. 1500. Museum Tusculanum Press. pp. 1–351. ISBN 978-87-7289-259-7.
- Daryaee, Touraj; Rezakhani, Khodadad (2017). "The Sasanian Empire". In Daryaee, Touraj (ed.). King of the Seven Climes: A History of the Ancient Iranian World (3000 BCE – 651 CE). UCI Jordan Center for Persian Studies. pp. 1–236. ISBN 978-0-692-86440-1.
- Hashemi Shahraki, A.; Carniel, E.; Mostafavi, E. (2016). "Plague in Iran: its history and current status". Epidemiology and Health. 38 e2016033. doi:10.4178/epih.e2016033. PMC 5037359. PMID 27457063.
- Mark, A. Shapur (2020). "Plagues of the Near East 562-1486 CE". World History Encyclopedia.
- Shahbazi, Joshua J. (2005). "Sasanian Dynasty". Encyclopaedia Iranica, Online Edition.
