= Shahrbanu =

Alleged wife of Husayn ibn Ali (died c. 659)

- شهربانو
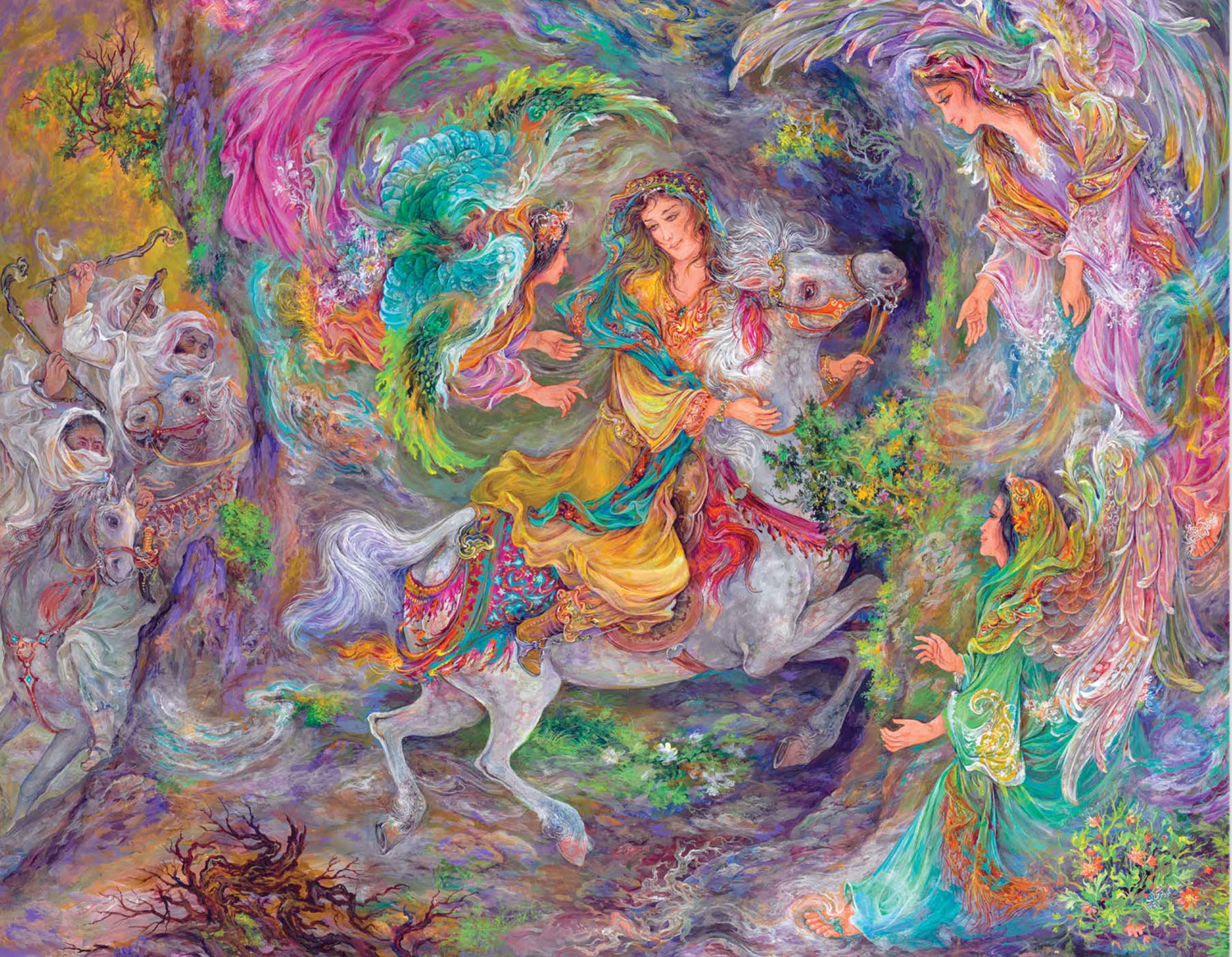
- Shahrbannu, a modern depiction by Iranian artist Mahmoud Farshchian
- Died: Bibi Shahr Banu Shrine (disputed)
- Other name: Shaharbānawayh Shāhzanān Shāhjahān Jahānshāh Salāma Salāfa Ghazāla Sādira
- Spouse: Husayn ibn Ali
- Children: Ali ibn Husayn Zayn al-Abidin
- Father: Yazdegerd III

Shahrbānū (or Shehr Bano) (Persian: شهربانو; "Lady of the Land") (Note: Shahrbanu has also been referred to with several other names by different writers, such as: Shaharbānawayh, Shāhzanān, Shāhjahān, Jahānshāh, Salāma, Salāfa, Ghazāla, and Sādira.) was a prominent figure in early Islamic traditions, in particular that of Shia Islam. These state that she was one of the wives of Husayn ibn Ali, the third Shia Imam and grandson of the Islamic prophet Muhammad, as well as the mother of his successor, Ali ibn Husayn. She was identified as a Sassanid princess, a daughter of Yazdegerd III, the last Sassanid emperor of Persia. However, Shahrbanu's existence is uncertain.

Islamic legends state that Shahrbanu was captured during the Muslim conquest of Persia. When presented before the Arab nobility and offered a choice in husband, she requested to be given in marriage to Husayn. The majority of Shia sources state that Shahrbanu died shortly after giving birth to her son Ali, and buried in the Jannat al-Baqi, alongside other members of Muhammad's family. Some traditions however, indicate to the Bibi Shahr Banu Shrine in Rey being her resting place.

Shahrbanu is viewed as a saintly figure by the Shia and is especially revered in Iran, her importance being partly tied to the link she provides between pre-Islamic Persia and modern Shi'ism. However, her historicity is uncertain. Islamic writers, such as al-Mubarrad, Ya'qubi and al-Kulayni, began alluding to Shahrbanu and her imperial Persian background from the 9th century onward. However, the earliest sources make no mention of the mother of Ali ibn Husayn, nor do they ascribe him with maternal royal ancestry. The first references were from Ibn Sa'd and Ibn Qutaybah, also in the 9th century, who instead describe her as being a slave from Sindh. This leads the Encyclopædia Iranica to consider that Shahrbanu was "undeniably legendary".

== Family background ==
Islamic histories regarding Shahrbanu generally state that she was a daughter of Yazdegerd III, the last Sassanid emperor of Persia. However, other identifications for her parentage have also been given. Muhammad ibn Ahmad Naysaburi cites a tradition that she was the daughter of Yazdegerd's father Prince Shahriyar, son of Khosrow II. Ibn Shahr Ashub relates that her father was the nushijan, a Persian ruler whose identity has not yet been further clarified. These are minority views however, with the belief of her being the daughter of Yazdegerd being the most prevalent.

Accounts are silent regarding Shahrbanu's mother. Yazdegerd is recorded to have had several wives and concubines, with Al-Tabari and Ibn Khaldun making specific references to a marriage he had made to a woman in Merv. However, Zameer Naqvi believes Shahrbanu's mother to have been a Sindhi princess named Mah Talat or Maha Talat. She may have been a member of the Buddhist Rai dynasty, with who the Sassanid emperors had maintained good relations. The present city of Matli, where her marriage to Yazdegerd supposedly took place, may have been named after her.

In addition to Shahrbanu, the historian Al-Masudi provides the names of four other children of Yazdegerd III; two sons, namely Peroz and Bahram, and two daughters, Adrag and Mardawand. While it was historically recorded that her brothers had escaped to the Tang emperor of China, Islamic traditions state that Shahrbanu's sisters were captured alongside her. One allegedly married Abdullah, son of the Caliph Umar, and became the mother of his son Salim, while another married Muhammad, son of the Caliph Abu Bakr, and became the mother of his son Qasim. Further alleged siblings have also been attributed to Shahrbanu, including Ghayanbanu, who was her full sister, Izdundad, who married the Jewish exilarch Bostanai, and Mihrbanu, who married Chandragupta, the Indian king of Ujjain.

== Capture and marriage ==
Accounts of Shahrbanu's capture generally state that she was taken during the Muslim conquest of Khorasan, either by Abdallah ibn Amir or Hurayth ibn Jabir. The princess (possibly alongside her sisters) was subsequently brought as a slave to Medina, where she was presented to the Caliph, who al-Kulayni identifies as being Umar ibn al-Khattab. A hadith reported by as-Saffar al-Qummi in the Shi'ite hadith work Basa'ir ad-Darajat gives the following account of Shahrbanu's arrival at Umar's court:

When they sought to take the daughter of Yazdegerd to Umar, she came to Medina; young girls climbed higher to see her and the Prophet's mosque was illuminated by her radiant face. Once she caught sight of Umar inside the mosque, she covered her face and sighed: "Ah piruz badha hormoz" (Persian: May Hormuz be victorious). Umar became angry and said: "She is insulting me." At this point, the Commander of the Faithful (Ali ibn Abi Talib) intervened and said to Umar: "Do not meddle, leave her alone! Let her choose a man among the Muslims and he will pay her price from the spoils he earned." Umar then said to the girl: "Choose!" She stepped forward and placed her hand on Husayn ibn Ali's head. The Commander of the Faithful asked her: "What is your name?" "Jahan Shah" she answered. And Ali added: "Shahrbanu also." (Note: It is uncertain whether Ali was merely mentioning another name that the princess was known by, or if he was conferring upon her an entirely new name.) He then turned to Husayn and said to him: "Husayn! She will be the mother of your son who shall be the best of those living in the world."

There is disagreement between various accounts regarding the details of the story. In al-Kulayni's Kitab al-Kafi, it was Umar's decision for Shahrbanu to choose her own husband, as opposed to Ali's. Keikavus' Qabusnama includes the involvement of Salman the Persian. The Uyun Akhbar al-Ridha by Ibn Babawayh reports that the caliph in question was not actually Umar, but his successor, Uthman. In relation to this, historian Mary Boyce states that al-Qummi's account ignores that the conquest of Khorasan took place during the latter's reign, as well as the fact that Shahrbanu's supposed son, Ali, was not born until over a decade after Umar's death.

== Death ==
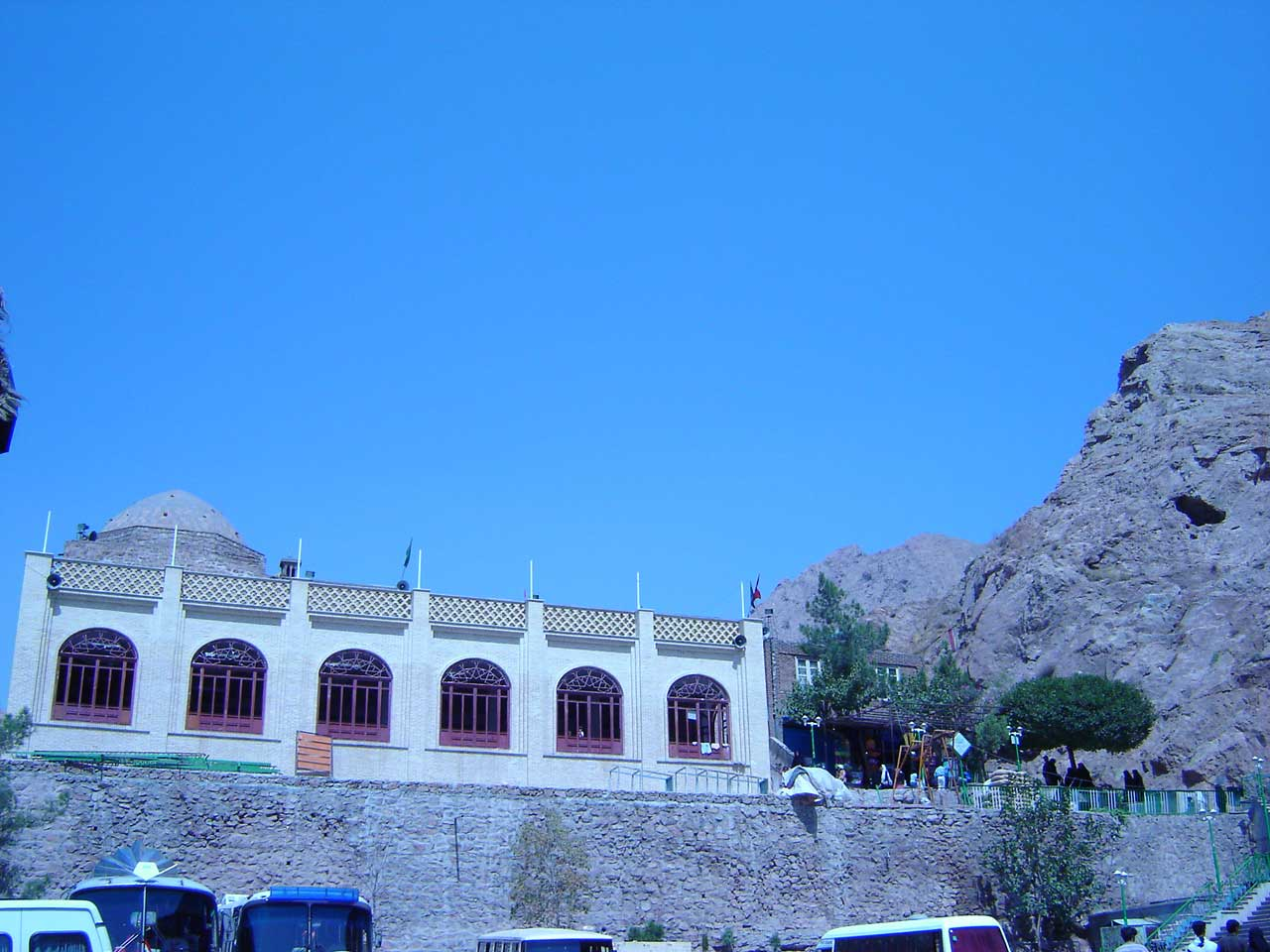
Shrine of Shahrbanu in Rey, Iran

The earliest sources regarding Shahrbanu make no mention of her ultimate fate, instead primarily focusing on the events of her capture and marriage. Later accounts added further details to the story, with multiple variations emerging regarding her death. Literary traditions state that she died upon giving birth to her son, Ali ibn Husayn in 659 CE. She was allegedly buried in the Jannat al-Baqī in Medina, her grave being beside that of her brother-in-law Hasan ibn Ali.

Another account narrates that Shahrbanu lived to see the Battle of Karbala in 680 CE. Having witnessed the massacre of her family during the battle, the princess drowned herself in the Euphrates to avoid the humiliation of captivity by the Umayyads.

A third version, as with the previous account, states that Shahbanu was alive during Karbala, but includes a miraculous aspect to the story. It states that prior to his death, Husayn gave Shahrbanu his horse and bid her to escape back to her homeland in Persia. She was closely pursued by Yazid's soldiers and as she approached the mountains surrounding Rey, she tried to call out to God in desperation. However, in her exhaustion she misspoke and rather than saying "Yallahu!" (Oh God!), she said "Ya kuh!" (Oh mountain!). The mountain then miraculously opened and she rode into it, leaving behind only a piece of her veil which had gotten caught as the chasm closed behind her. This became an object of veneration, with the area becoming a shrine as well as a popular pilgrimage site.

Mary Boyce believed that the latter story was a 10th-century invention, considering it to be probable that the shrine was previously dedicated to the Zoroastrian goddess Anahid. She states that as Zoroastrianism and the worship of Anahid became less predominant in the region, a link was probably formed between the site and Shahrbanu in order for the veneration of the Persian princess to take its place. It is also notable that the word "Banu" (Lady) is strongly associated with Anahid, making it likely that "Shahrbanu" (Lady of the land) was the title originally used to dedicate the old shrine.

== Historicity ==
The historicity of Shahrbanu is highly debatable, with no source available which can truly confirm or deny her existence. While it was certainly within the influence of Husayn's father, Ali ibn Abi Talib, to have had him married to a captive daughter of Yazdegerd III, contemporary sources make no mention of such an event. Early histories regarding the invasion of Persia by authors such as Ibn Abd Rabbih and al-Tabari, often written with great attention to detail, do not establish any relationship between the Sassanid royal family and a wife of Husayn. The same is true for a wide range of sources, such as the Hanafi judge Abu Yusuf in his treatise on taxation, the Kitab al-Kharaj, nor Ferdowsi in his epic, the Shahnameh.

The first mentions of the mother of Ali ibn Husayn come two hundred years later from Ibn Sa'd and Ibn Qutaybah in the 9th century, who both describe her as a slave from Sindh named Gazala or Solafa. They go on to claim that after the death of his father, Ali freed his mother and gave her in marriage to a client of Husayn's named Zuyaid, to whom she bore a son, Abdullah. Ya'qubi, who wrote around the same time as Ibn Qutaybah, was the first to suggest that Ali's mother was an enslaved daughter of Yazdegerd, stating that she was nicknamed Gazala by Husayn. The Tarikh-i Qum and the Firaq al-Shi'a, both written around the 10th century, give a similar story, but state that she was originally called either Shahrbanu or Jahanshah and was later renamed Solafa.

There is therefore a consistency between the early sources that the mother of Ali was named Gazala or Solafa, and that she was an eastern slave belonging to Husayn. The dispute only arises regarding her original identity and subsequent fate. Ibn Babawayh however, also writing in the 10th century, records a Shia tradition which combines the two stories. It states that Ali was the son of a daughter of Yazdegerd who died in childbirth. He was subsequently raised by a concubine of Husayn's, who was publicly assumed to be his mother. When Ali later arranged for the concubine to be married, he was mocked due to the belief that he had given his own mother away. This tradition acts to support the earlier accounts whilst also providing an explanation for the contradictions. Based on the various testimonies, Mary Boyce surmised that Ali's mother was a Sindhi concubine, who he later freed and arranged to be married. The Shahrbanu story subsequently emerged to explain away the aspects which may have been viewed as unpalatable.

It is also thought that the legend of Shahrbanu was used to provide a link between pre-Islamic Persia and Shi'ism, something which is thought to be an extremely important aspect for the Persian converts of the period. Through Shahrbanu, the Shia Imams would have possessed legitimacy in two forms: through their paternal descent from Ali ibn Abi Talib and Fatima, daughter of Muhammad, and their maternal descent from the ancient Persian kings. Later incarnations of the story may have magnified the Persian aspect with this in mind, with increasing emphasis being put on the princess's royalty. Ali ibn Abi Talib plays an important role in this, with he and Shahrbanu conversing in Persian, him insisting on her freedom and nobility of rank as well as predicting the birth of the future Imam. It is also notable that for several centuries, the writers who reported the story had almost exclusively been Persians or Persianized Shias, such as al-Kulayni, Ibn Babawayh and Ibn Shahr Ashub. Subsequently, it appears that Shahrbanu served as a factor in the convergence between the persecuted Shias and the conquered Persians. A similar effort was attempted several centuries later to connect the mother of the twelfth Imam to the Byzantine emperors and the Apostle Simon, thereby linking the Imams to Shi'ism, Mandaeism, and Christianity, though this proved less successful.

Iranian scholar and politician Morteza Motahhari argued against this reasoning, stating that the Shia Imams' potential Sassanid ancestry would not have especially attracted Persians to Shi'ism. Noting that the mother of the Yazid III is believed to be a daughter of Peroz III, Motahhari added that the Persians had no equivalent inclination towards the Umayyad dynasty. Similarly, the Umayyad general Ubayd Allah ibn Ziyad is also not especially esteemed based on his maternal Persian heritage. In addition to this, Motahhari asserted that Shahrbanu is not venerated in Iran above the mothers of the other Imams, who came from a multitude of ethnic backgrounds, such as Narjis, who is believed to have been a Roman concubine.
