= Narsieh =

Tang dynasty general

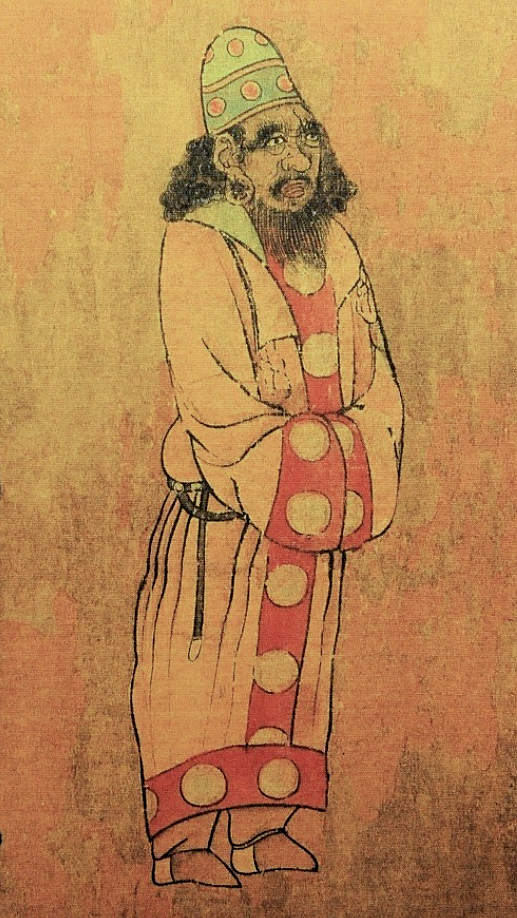
Ambassador from Persia (波斯國), visiting the court of the Tang dynasty. The Gathering of Kings (王会图), circa 650 CE

Narsieh (Middle Persian: 𐭭𐭥𐭮𐭧𐭩 Narseh; simplified Chinese: 泥涅师; traditional Chinese: 泥涅師; pinyin: Nìnièshī) was a Persian general who fled to the Tang dynasty with his father, Peroz III, son of Yazdegerd III, the last Sasanian emperor of Persia, after the Muslim conquest of Persia.

He was escorted back to Persia with a Chinese army led by Pei Xingjian in 679, in order to restore him to the Sasanian throne. Pei's primary objective, however, was to vanquish an insurgency led by Khan claimant Ashina Duzhi of a Tang protectorate, the Western Turkic Khaganate; the army stopped in Tokharistan after Pei Xingjian defeated the Turks. Concerned by the long route to Persia, Pei lost interest in reinstalling Narsieh as the Persian king and left him in the Anxi Protectorate alone, although Narsieh was able to keep his many servants and a high quality of life. Minor Turkic chieftains in the region then pledged their loyalty to the Tang dynasty due to the defeat of Ashina. The overall result of Pei's expedition was a success for the Tang. Upon returning to China, Pei was appointed the minister of rituals and Great General of the Right Flank Guards.

Narsieh then spent the next twenty years fighting the Arabs in Tokharistan until he returned to the Tang capital of Chang'an in 707, where he lived out the remainder of his life before dying of disease at some point after 708/709.

== Heirs ==
Narsieh was followed as the head of the Sasanian dynasty by his son, who is recorded in Chinese sources under the name Bó Qiāng Huó; his Persian name may have been Pušang. Bó Qiāng Huó was active against the Arabs in Tokharistan in 723 and was recognized as "king of Persia" in Chinese sources. He was followed by another Sasanian prince, recorded as Mù Shānuò, who was active until at least 731.

Narsieh's uncle, Bahram, died in 710, and Bahram's son, Khosrow, was mentioned fighting alongside Sogdians and Turks against the Arabs at the siege of Kamarja in 729 in a futile attempt to restore Sasanian rule.

In 1955 a bilingual Chinese and Middle Persian (Pahlavi) epitaph was found in the western suburbs of Xi'an, the former Tang capital Chang'an. It marks the grave of the wife of Su Liang (蘇諒), an officer of the Left Shence Army, who died in 874 (the 15th year of Xiantong) at the age of 26. The Pahlavi text shows that the couple were Persian Zoroastrians, and it ends with a prayer that the deceased dwell with Ahura Mazda. The Chinese and Pahlavi versions differ on several points, including her relationship to Su Liang and the date of death. It is the earliest known Persian inscription found in China. Scholars do not agree on how to read the Persian names. Humbach reads the woman's name as Māhnūš and Su Liang's as Farroxzād, while other scholars have linked Su Liang's name to the Parthian noble house of Suren.

== See also ==
- Iranians in China

Titles in pretence
| Preceded by Peroz III | — TITULAR — Sasanian King; 679–after 708/709; Reason for succession failure: Islamic conquest of Persia | Succeeded by Bó Qiāng Huó |
