= Persia Governorate =

Persia Governorate 波斯都督府
- Client state of Great Tang
- 661–663
- Capital: Zarang
- Government
  - Type: Principality
- Governor
  - 661-663: Peroz III
- History
  - Title granted by Tang dynasty: 661
  - Conquered by Umayyad Caliphate: 663
Preceded by	Succeeded by
Sasanian Empire	Umayyad Caliphate
- Today part of: Iran and Afghanistan

Persia Governorate (Middle Chinese: 波斯都督府, Pua-sie To-tuuk-pyo), or Persia Area Command, was a governorate established by Tang dynasty during mid-7th century located in Sakastan, today's eastern Iran and southwestern Afghanistan.

In the 1st year of Longshuo (Middle Chinese: 龍朔, Lyung-sruk, 661-664 CE), Peroz III submitted a report to the Tang court stating that he had frequently been harassed by Arabian forces and requested military aid. An imperial decree was subsequently issued, establishing prefectures and counties in the region, designating Zarang (Middle Chinese: 疾陵城, Dzit-ling Dzyeng) as the government seat, and conferring Peroz III with the title of Governor (Chinese: 都督).

In 663, the Arabs defeated Peroz III, who would later seek refuge in Chang'an and be granted the title of General of the Right Militant Guard (Chinese: 右武衛將軍).
