= Siege of Kamarja =

Battle fought in 729 CE

- Part of the Muslim conquest of Transoxiana
- Map of Khurasan and Transoxiana in the 8th century
Date	729
Location	Kamarja, near Samarkand (modern Uzbekistan) 39.953°N 66.379°E
Result	Umayyad victory; Arab garrison allowed to evacuate

Belligerents
Umayyad Caliphate	Türgesh Khaganate; Allied Soghdian princes

Commanders and leaders
Ashras ibn Abdallah al-Sulami	Suluk

The siege of Kamarja was fought in 729 between the Umayyad Caliphate and the Türgesh Khaganate, along with its Soghdian allies. The Umayyad conquest of Transoxiana had been undone in the 720s by the uprisings of the local Soghdian princes and the Türgesh invasions. By 729, the small fortress of Kamarja near Samarkand (in modern Uzbekistan) was one of the last remaining Arab strongholds in Transoxiana, when it was attacked by the Türgesh under the personal direction of their ruler, Suluk. The subsequent siege, for which a detailed account survives in the history of al-Tabari, lasted for 58 days and ended with the negotiated withdrawal of its garrison to Samarkand. The stubborn defence of Kamarja was celebrated in Arabic literature, but the Arab hold over the region was broken after the Battle of the Defile two years later. It was only following the collapse of the Türgesh Khaganate after 738 that the Arabs re-established their rule over Transoxiana.

== Background ==
The region of Transoxiana (Arabic: Ma wara' al-nahr) had been conquered by the Umayyad leader Qutayba ibn Muslim in the reign of al-Walid I (r. 705–715), following the Muslim conquests of Persia and Khurasan in the mid-7th century. The loyalty to the Caliphate of Transoxiana's native Iranian and Turkic populations and of the autonomous local rulers remained questionable, and in 719 the latter requested aid from the Chinese and their Türgesh vassals. In response, from 720 on the Türgesh launched a series of attacks against the Muslims in Transoxiana, coupled with uprisings against the Caliphate among the local Soghdians. The Umayyad governors initially managed to suppress the unrest, although control over the Ferghana Valley was lost. In 724, governor Muslim ibn Sa'id al-Kilabi and his army suffered a heavy defeat (the so-called "Day of Thirst") at the hands of the Türgesh when he tried to recapture Ferghana. This defeat pushed the Arabs on the defensive, and even though no pitched battles took place, over the next few years the Arab position in Transoxiana collapsed swiftly. By 728, in the face of the Türgesh attacks and a widespread anti-Arab revolt, only Samarkand and the two fortresses of Kamarja and Dabusiyya on the Zarafshan River remained in Arab hands in all of Transoxiana.

== Siege ==
In 729, the new Arab governor, Ashras ibn Abdallah al-Sulami, managed to cross the Oxus River and reach Bukhara against stiff opposition by the Türgesh and their Soghdian allies. The Arab victory was narrow, and the Türgesh were able to withdraw unmolested back towards the region of Samarkand, which brought them near the Arab fortress of Kamarja, a fortified town some seven farsakhs—roughly 42 kilometres (26 miles)—west of Samarkand. The subsequent siege of Kamarja, narrated in al-Tabari's History of the Prophets and Kings is, in the words of the historian Hugh N. Kennedy, "one of the most vividly described set pieces of the war".

The Türgesh army under the khagan Suluk, which included the contingents of Ferghana, al-Taraband (capital of Shash, modern Tashkent), Afshinah (a town near Samarkand), Nasaf, and Bukhara, approached along the Bukhara–Samarkand road. When they reached Kamarja, the Türgesh and their allies left the road and made camp, but the town's garrison was unaware of their approach as their movements were screened by a hill. The next morning, when the Arabs took their animals out to water them and climbed the hill, they were amazed to encounter the "mountain of steel" of their enemies' army, as al-Tabari writes. The Arabs sent some of their animals down the hill towards the river to lure the Türgesh that way, and hastened back to the town. The Türgesh soon discovered them and began pursuit, but the Arabs knew the terrain better and managed to reach the town and find refuge behind its earthworks, just before their pursuers caught up with them. A fierce fight developed as the Türgesh attacked the gates and tried to enter the town, until the Arabs threw burning bundles of wood at them, driving them back across the moat. In the evening, the Türgesh withdrew, and the Arabs burned the wooden bridge that spanned the moat.

The khagan then sent two emissaries to the besieged. The first to approach the wall was Khosrau, a grandson of the last Sassanid Persian ruler, Yazdegerd III (r. 632–651). Khosrau's father, Bahram, had fled to the Tang court in China, and now Khosrau accompanied the Türgesh in hopes of recovering his ancestral throne. When he approached the garrison, he urged them to surrender and offered them a safe-conduct, while proclaiming the restoration of his realm. The Arabs, however, indignantly refused to hear him and hurled abuses at him. As the Orientalist scholar H.A.R. Gibb writes, the presence of Khosrau "might be taken as an indication that the rebels were receiving encouragement from China also, though the Chinese records are silent on this expedition". After Khosrau's failure, the khagan sent a local, Bazaghari, to parley with the garrison, bringing a few Arab captives along with him to intimidate them. The khagan offered to take up the Arab garrison into his own army, doubling their salary, but this proposal too was rejected with disdain by the Arab negotiator, Yazid ibn Sa'id al-Bahili (chosen because he spoke a little Turkish), with the words "How can the Arabs, who are wolves, be with the Türgesh, who are sheep?" His reply infuriated Bazaghari's companions, who threatened to kill him, so Yazid offered to split the garrison up: one half with their portable wealth would be allowed to retreat safely, while the other half would remain in service with the Türgesh. Bazaghari accepted this offer and sent Yazid back to convey the terms to the garrison, but once he was back inside the wall, he rejected the terms and exhorted his fellow Arabs to resist.

The khagan then ordered his men to fill the moat with green wood, so that it would not burn, which the garrison countered by throwing in dry wood as well. After six days, when the moat was full, the Arabs set it afire; aided by a strong wind, the hard work of the Türgesh was put to nought. The Arab archers also proved effective, exacting a heavy toll among the Türgesh, including Bazaghari. The Türgesh then executed a hundred Arab captives in full view of the garrison. In response, the Arabs killed the 200 young locals they held as hostages, despite their desperate resistance. The narrative of the siege in al-Tabari, evidently drawing from eyewitness accounts, continues with isolated episodes: the determined Türgesh assault on the gate, with five of them managing to climb the wall before being repelled, the Soghdian prince of al-Taraband who with his companions assaulted a breach in the wall which led into a house only to be killed by the house's elderly and sick owner and his family, how the Arabs used the wooden boards lining the irrigation ditches to improve their earthworks, or the time when the khagan, coming to inspect the Arab fortifications, received an arrow-shot in the face but was saved by his helmet's nose-guard.

The stubborn defence of the garrison irritated the khagan, who blamed his Soghdian allies for claiming that there were "fifty donkeys in this (town) and that we would take it in five days, but now the five days have become two months". At length, the khagan resumed negotiations, and offered safe-conduct to either Dabusiyya or Samarkand, which were still in Arab hands. The garrison sent a rider to Samarkand to ask for advice, and was told to choose Dabusiyya, which was closer to Kamarja. After fifty-eight days, out of which, according to al-Tabari, the garrison "did not water their camels for thirty-five days", the siege was over. The Arabs and Türgesh exchanged five hostages each, including one of Suluk's most important nobles, Kursul. After the mutual massacre of captives early in the siege, the Arabs' mistrust was such that they refused to leave until the khagan and his army had departed, and an Arab with a dagger in his hand was seated behind each of the Türgesh hostages, who wore no armour.

As the Arab garrison of Kamarja approached Dabusiyya, the latter's garrison at first believed that Kamarja had fallen and that the soldiers coming towards them were Türgesh, but as they arrayed themselves for battle, a rider sent by the Kamarja troops alerted them as to the real situation, and "the men of al-Dabusiyya galloped forward to carry whoever was too weak to walk or was wounded". At this the hostages began being released, with the Arabs sending a hostage back and the Türgesh in turn releasing one of the hostages they held. In the end, when the last two hostages were left, neither side was willing to let its own hostage go first, until the Arab hostage volunteered to go last. For this act of chivalry, he was richly rewarded by Kursul with a suit of armour and a horse.

== Aftermath ==
As Gibb writes, "the fame of the defence of Kamarja spread far and wide, but it brought little relief to the pressure on the Arabs". Almost all of Transoxiana, except for Bukhara and Samarkand, was lost, and even in neighbouring Khwarizm, a revolt broke out, which was nonetheless swiftly suppressed by the local Arab settlers. Samarkand remained the last major outpost of Arab rule deep in Soghdia, and subsequent operations by both sides focused around it. It was while attempting to relieve the Türgesh siege of the city in 731 that the Arabs suffered the calamitous Battle of the Defile, which was followed by the complete collapse of the Arab position in Transoxiana. The Arabs were not able to recover until the murder of Suluk in 738, which led to the outbreak of civil war and brought about the rapid decline of Türgesh power. In 739–741, under the governorship of Nasr ibn Sayyar, the Arabs managed to re-establish the Caliphate's authority up to Samarkand.

== Sources ==
- Blankinship, Khalid Yahya, ed. (1989). The History of al-Ṭabarī, Volume XXV: The End of Expansion: The Caliphate of Hishām, A.D. 724–738/A.H. 105–120. SUNY Series in Near Eastern Studies. Albany, New York: State University of New York Press. ISBN 978-0-88706-569-9.
- Blankinship, Khalid Yahya (1994). The End of the Jihâd State: The Reign of Hishām ibn ʻAbd al-Malik and the Collapse of the Umayyads. Albany, New York: State University of New York Press. ISBN 978-0-7914-1827-7.
- Gibb, H. A. R. (1923). The Arab Conquests in Central Asia. London: The Royal Asiatic Society.
- Kennedy, Hugh (2007). The Great Arab Conquests: How the Spread of Islam Changed the World We Live In. Philadelphia, Pennsylvania: Da Capo Press. ISBN 978-0-306-81740-3.
