= Bibi Shahrbanu Shrine =

Shi'ite shrine in Tehran, Iran

- آرامگاه بی‌بی شهربانو

- Location of the complex in Iran

Religion
- Affiliation: Islam
- Ecclesiastical or organisational status: Shrine
- Status: Active

Location
- Location: Shahr-e Ray, Tehran, Tehran province
- Country: Iran
- Interactive map of Bibi Shahrbanu Shrine
- Coordinates: 35°35′26″N 51°29′36″E

Architecture
- Type: Islamic architecture
- Style: Sasanian; Buyid; Safavid; Qajar
- Established: 10th century CE (prime); 888 AH (1483/1484 CE) (shrine)

Specifications
- Dome: One (likely more)
- Shrine: One: Shahrbanu
- Materials: Stone; bricks; mortar; tiles

Iran National Heritage List
- Official name: Bibi Shahrbanu Shrine
- Type: Mausoleum
- Designated: 1936
- Reference no.: 256
- Conservation organization: Cultural Heritage, Handicrafts and Tourism Organization of Iran

The Bibi Shahrbanu Shrine (Note: Also spelled as the Bibi Shahr Banu Shrine.) (Persian: آرامگاه بی‌بی شهربانو, romanized: ârâmgâh-e bi-bi šahrbânu) is an Islamic shrine, located near Shahr-e Ray, a southern suburb of Tehran, in the province of Tehran, Iran. According to the inscription in the shrine and the belief of the people, the shrine is the tomb of Shahrbanu, the wife of the third Shia Imam Husayn, and the mother of the fourth Shia Imam, Ali al-Sajjad.

The oldest parts of the shrine date from the 15th century, shortly before the Safavid Empire. Researchers have discussed, if the name of the shrine and the location could point to an earlier pre-Islamic holy site, possible a sanctuary of the goddess Anahita of the ancient Iranian religion, Zoroastrianism. The complex was added to the Iran National Heritage List on 31 July 1933, administered by the Cultural Heritage, Handicrafts and Tourism Organization of Iran. The shrine a holy site in Shia Islam.

== History ==
From an architectural perspective, its southeastern corner, which consists of a regular and solid stone building with a stone and brick cladding, dates from the Buyid, and its shrine and long southern room date from the Sasanian era, while the outer walls of the courtyard are contemporary with the stone building from the Buyid dynasty era and the Seljuk era. In the following centuries, by constructing a portico, walls, various rooms, a corridor, etc., the main area was divided into two courtyards and transformed into its current form. The dome of the tomb dates from the Daylamites period.

The carved Marquetry box under the tomb contains saying of the Prophet of Islam, Muhammad, and also contains the honorific titles of Shahrbanu; and is dated 888 AH (1483/1484 CE). The names of the shrine founder and builders are mentioned under the box. A beautiful carving Marquetry from the era of King Tahmasp I is located in the southeast of the shrine, which is its main and old entrance. There are also other historical monuments in the tomb.

== Architecture ==
This tomb is a rectangular area (north-south), 33 metres (108 ft) long and 22 metres (72 ft) wide, enclosed by a stone wall dating from the 4th century SH (Buyid and Seljuk eras), and bordered by mountains to the north. In its southern part, there are several solid stone buildings covered with domes made of stone and brick. The main area (sahn) has been divided into two parts by the construction of new walls, porches, rooms, corridors, etc. in various periods.

The main building of the tomb is made of stone and plaster, and its arches are made of brick. The style and condition of the building suggest that its main core was built during the Sasanian era, and in the fourth century SH, during the Buyid era, it was used as a tomb and some parts were added to it. The tomb consists of a small rectangular shrine with dimensions of approximately 2.5 by 3 metres (8 ft 2 in by 9 ft 10 in). The main entrance to the shrine faces east and has a pediment dating from the Safavid era, but the tiled dome and some of its stucco and decorations are from the Qajar era.

In front of the door is a vestibule that was once a porch and was part of the inner courtyard of the tomb. To the south of this atrium, there is a sturdy square stone building that measures 8 by 5 metres (26 by 16 ft) and with a corrugated iron roof dating from the 4th century SH. To the south of the shrine is a long, closed room in an east–west direction, which is thought to date back to the Sasanian Empire period. The room leads from the east to the aforementioned square stone building, and it turns out that it was originally the entrance to the stone building. To the north of the tomb, there is a mosque or portico from the Qajar dynasty period. The larger courtyard of the tomb, which is considered its outer courtyard, is located to the north of the mosque. A room has been built in the north of the courtyard for the accommodation of the trustee's guests or other pilgrims.

At the bottom of the steps of the Bibi Shahrbanu tomb and on the right side, there is a cave with a narrow entrance. Inside the cave, candles are also lit for vows. In this part of the cave, there is a lattice window that is said to be used by young girls to tie a knot in order to improve their date luck.

== Gallery ==
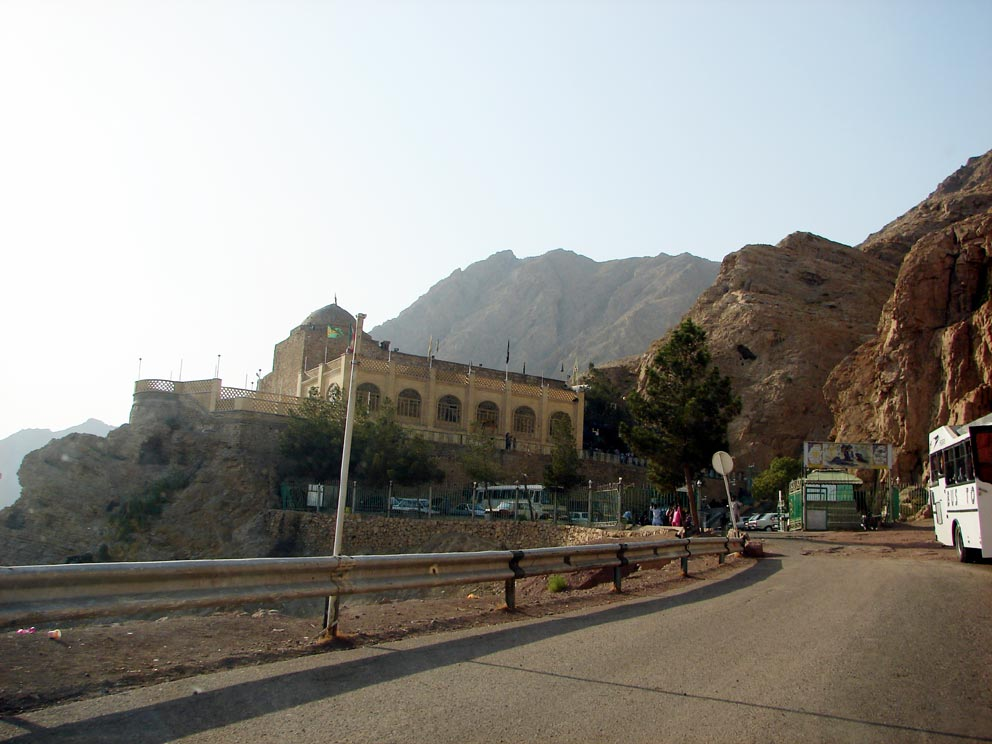

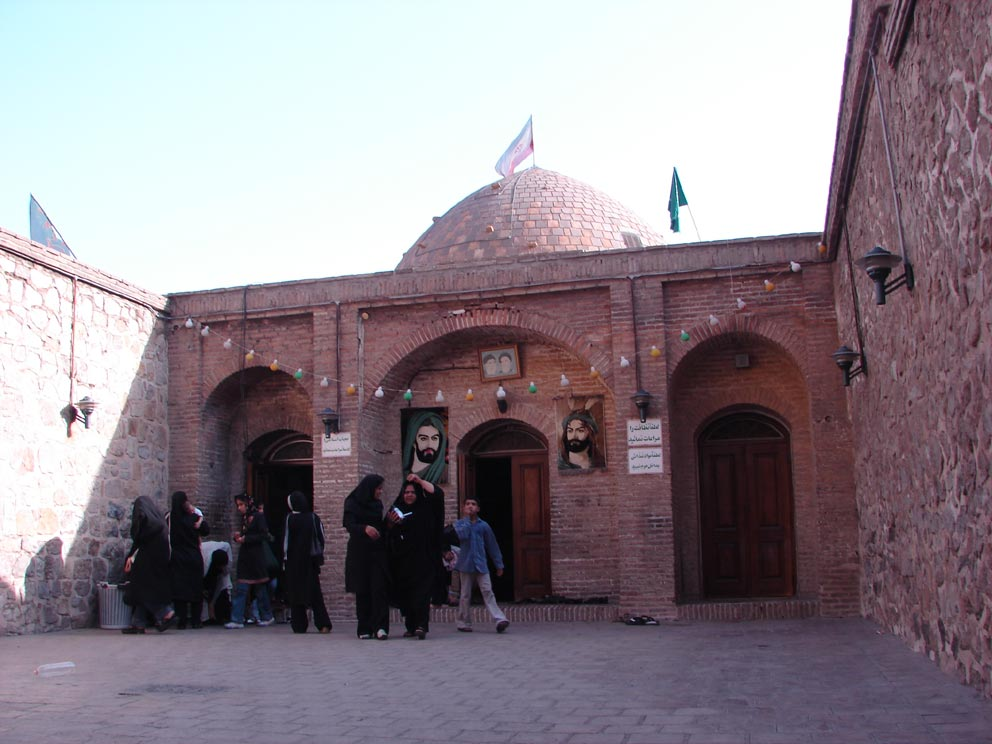

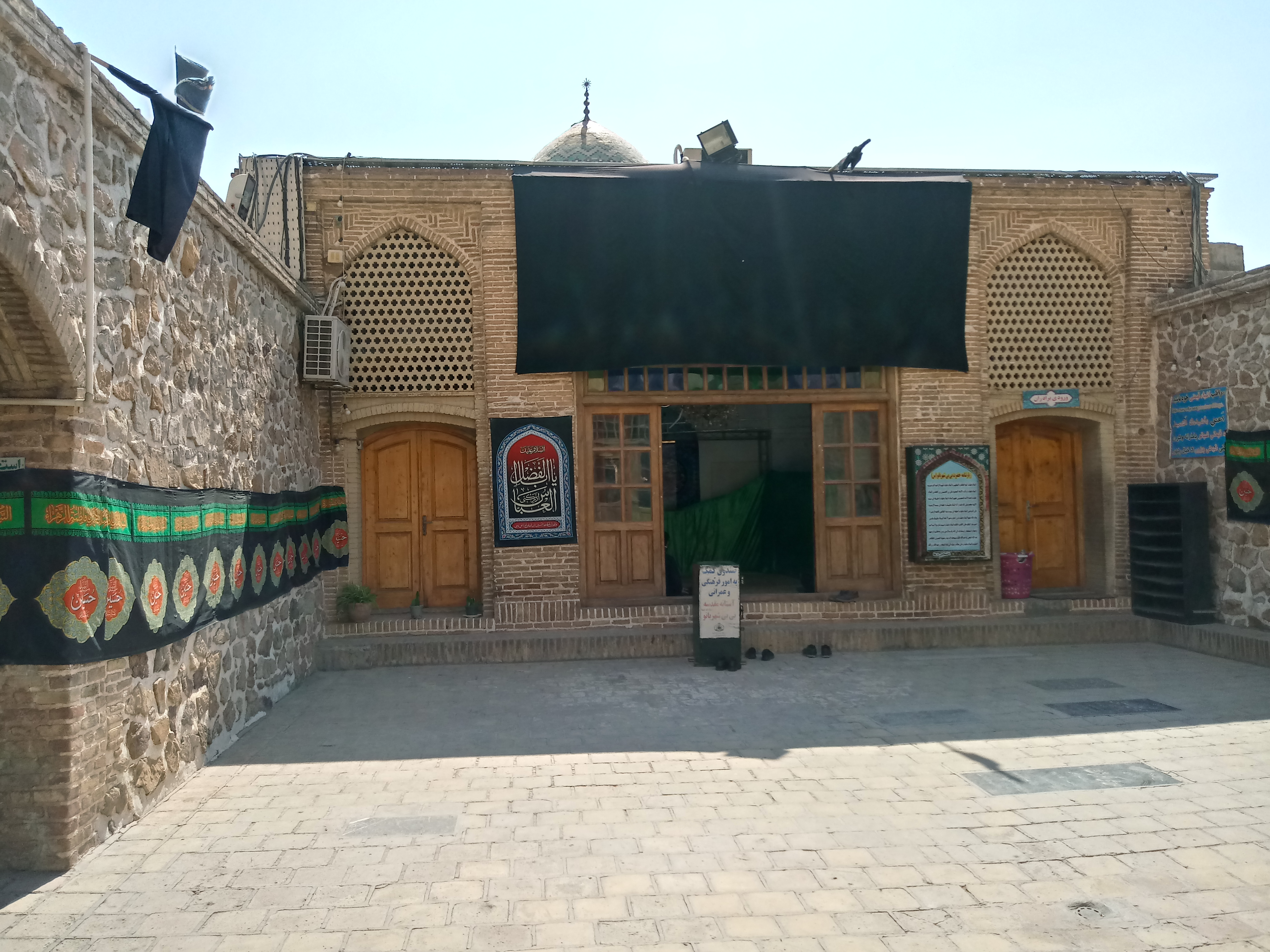

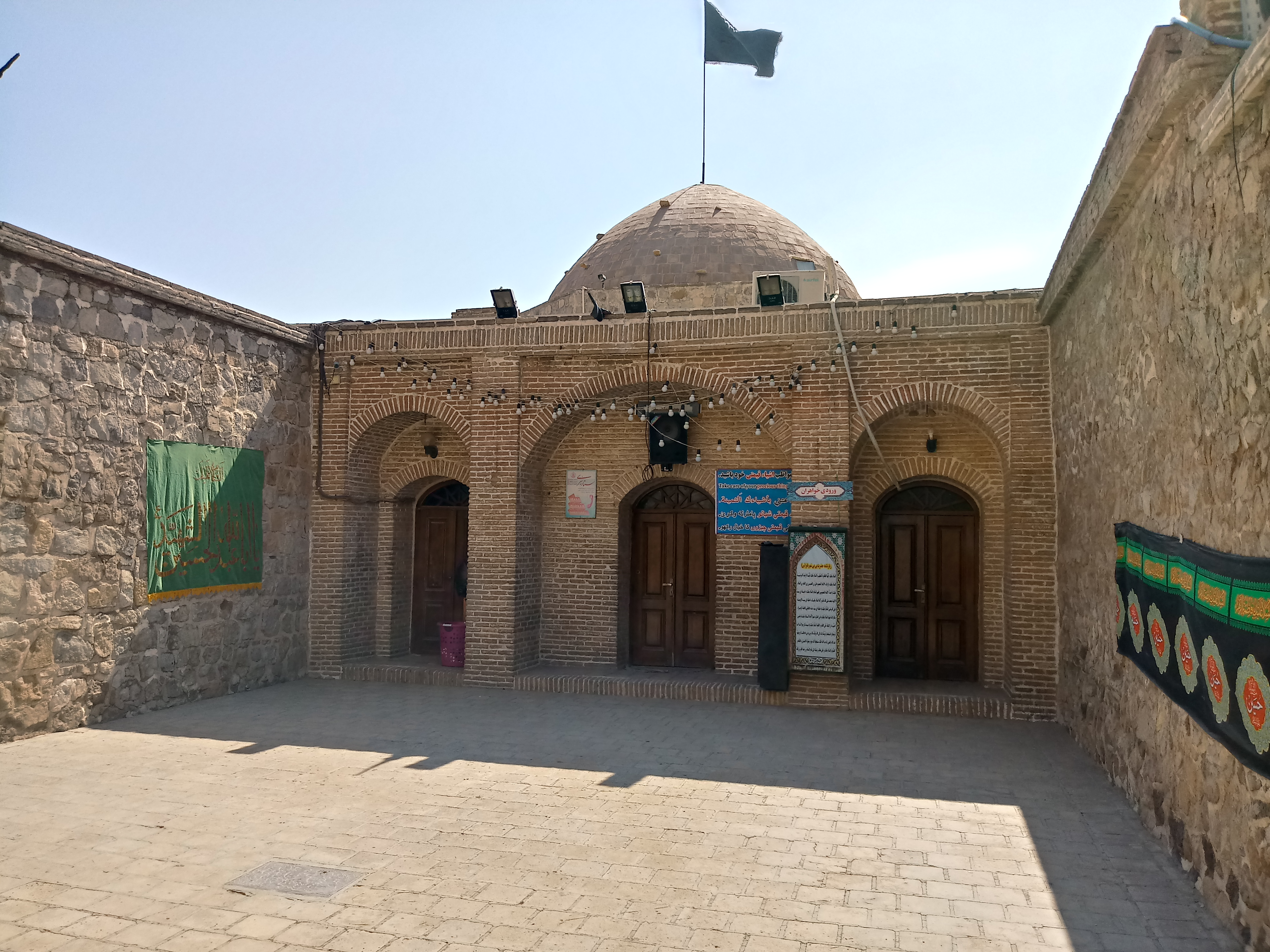

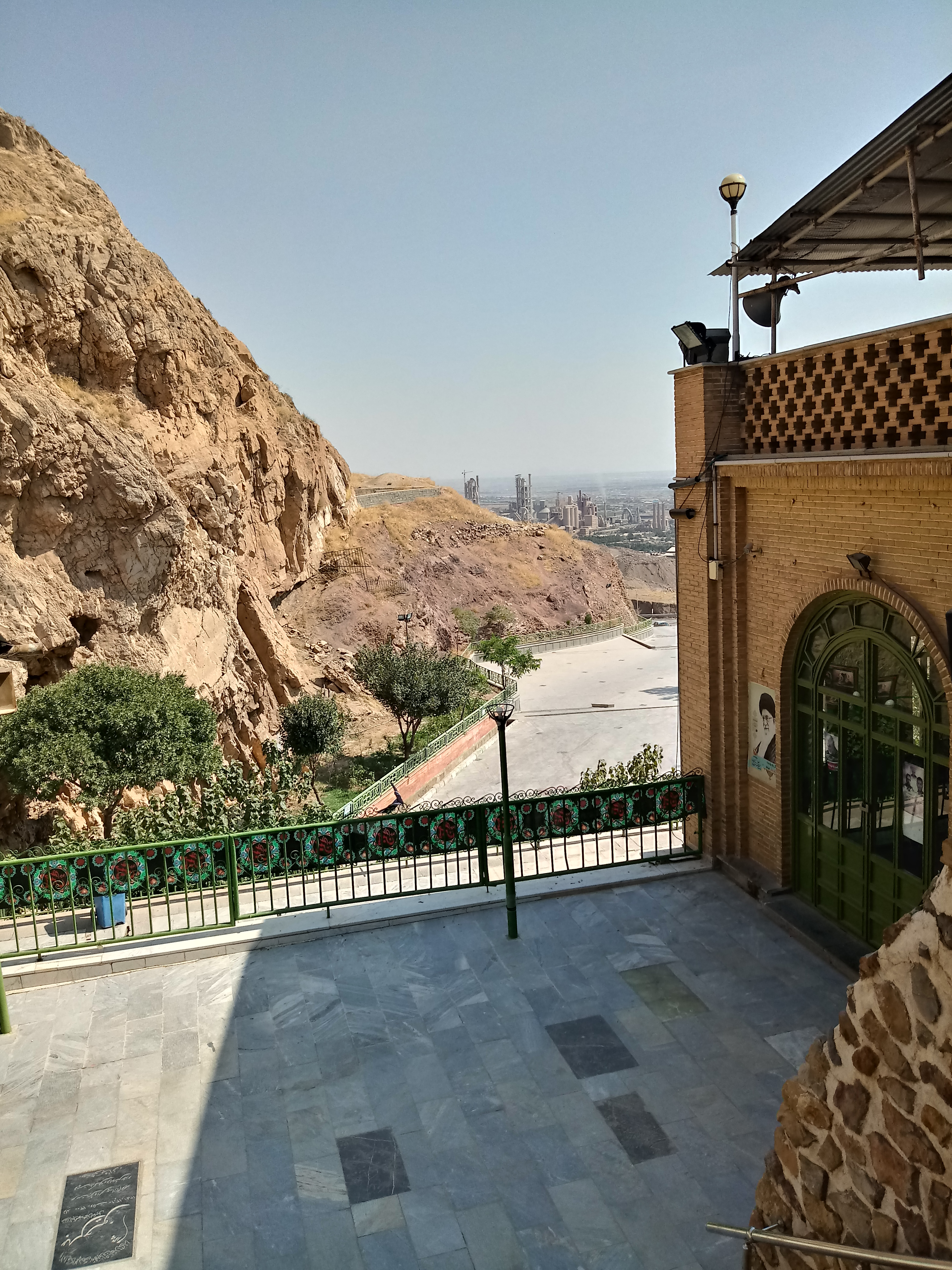

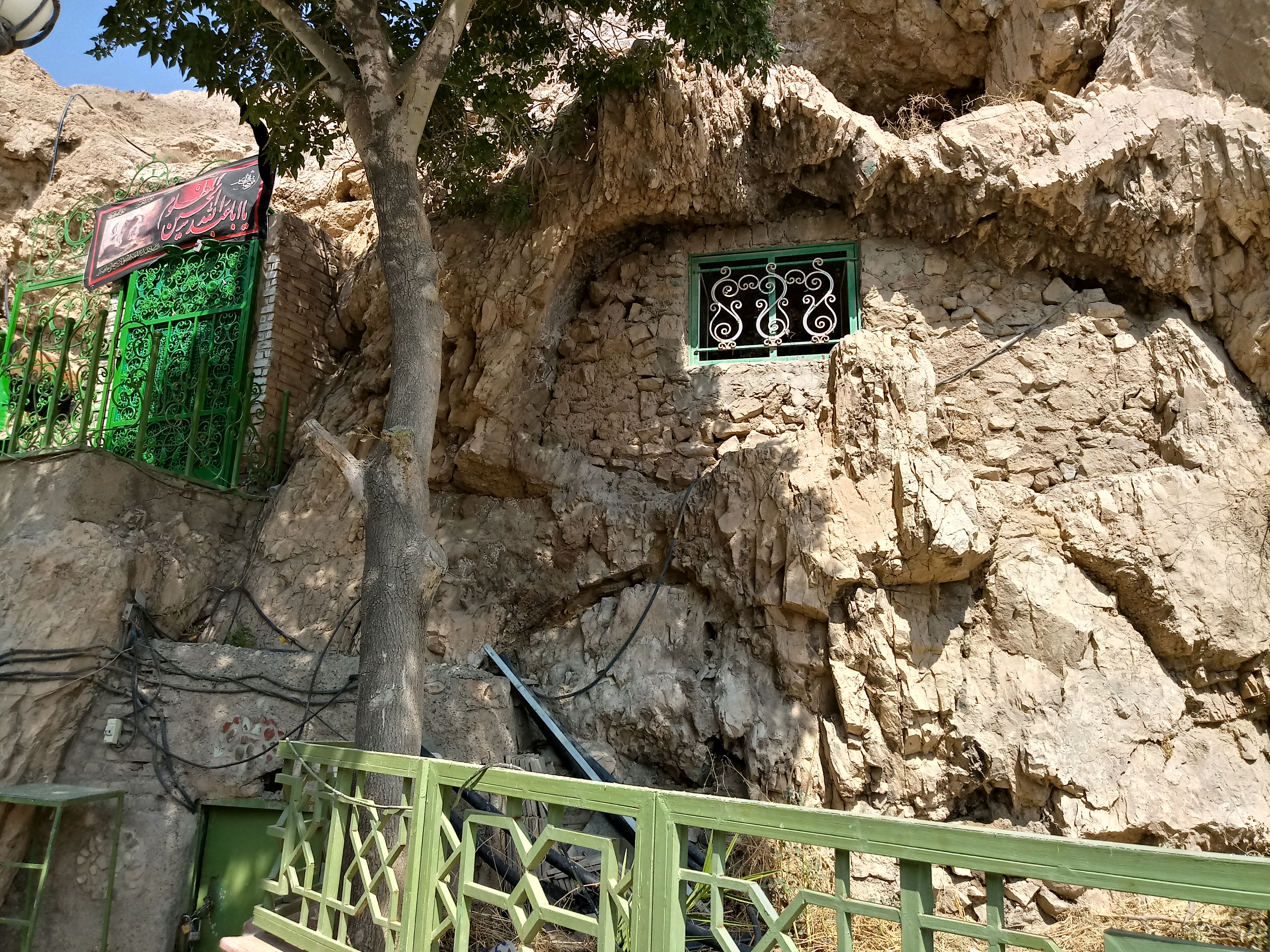

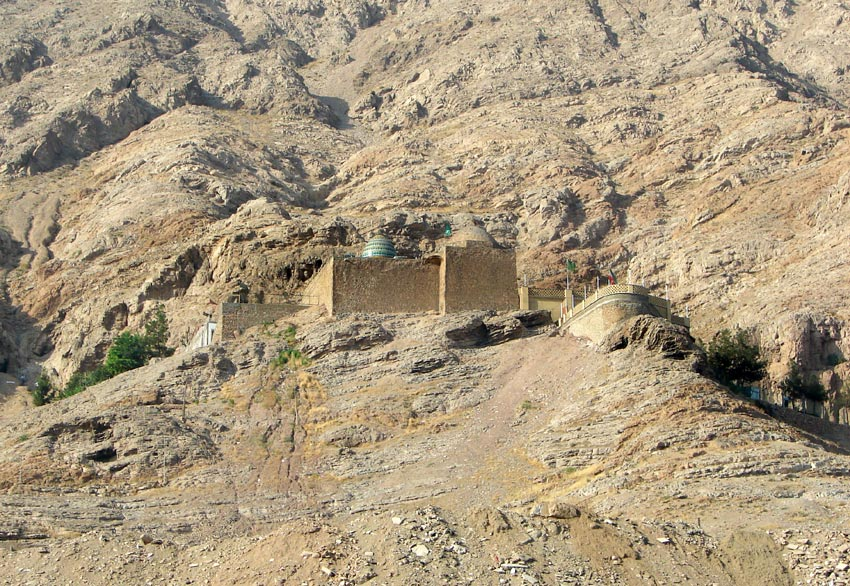

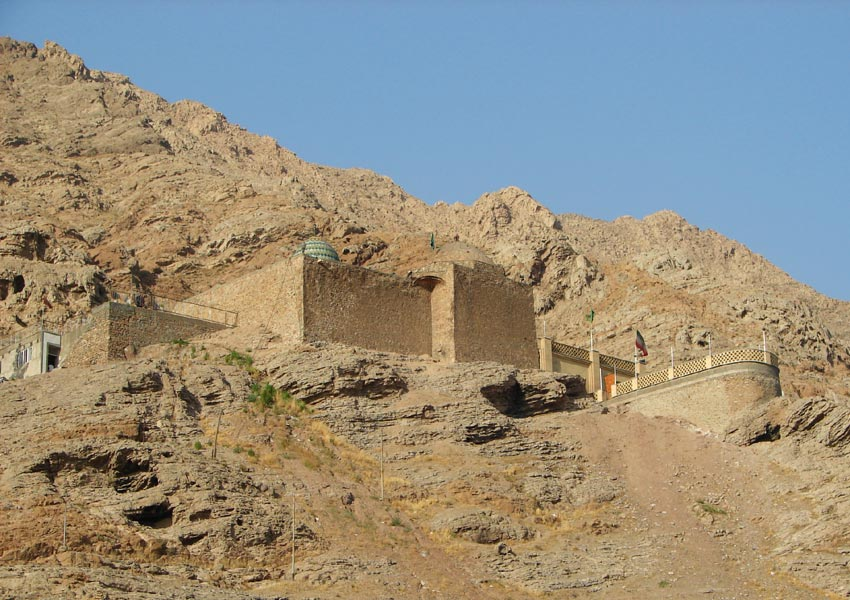

== See also ==
- List of mausoleums in Iran
- Shia Islam in Iran
