= Peroz III =

- Prince of the Sasanians; Governor of Persia
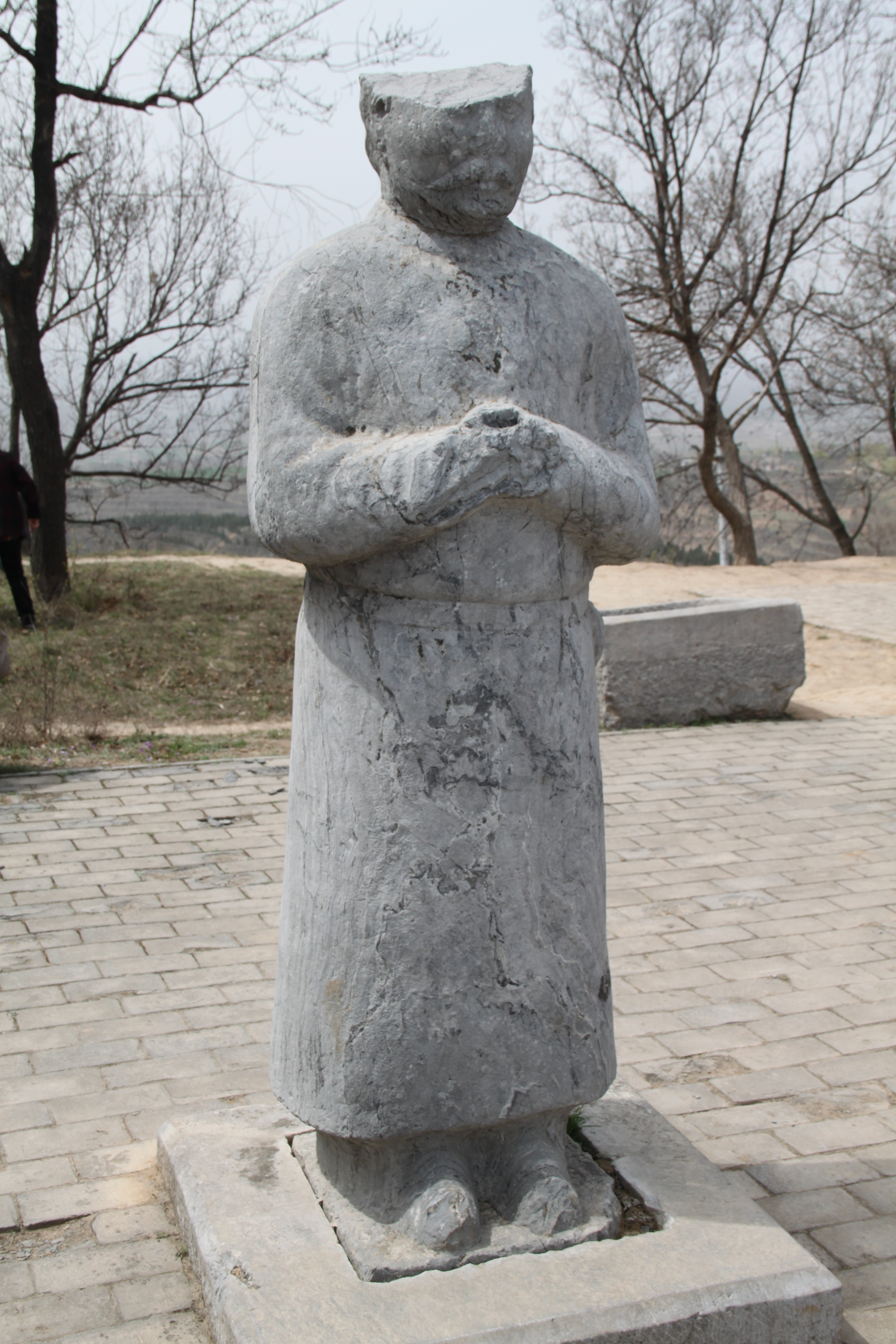
- A statue of Peroz is known to stand among the statues of "61 foreign officials" at the Qian Mausoleum. This statue, with long curly hair and a Parthian moustache could belong to Peroz or his son Narsieh.
- Born: 636; Sasanian Iran
- Died: c. 678; Tang China
- Spouses: Turkic noblewoman
- Issue: Narsieh
- House: House of Sasan
- Father: Yazdegerd III
- Religion: Zoroastrianism

Peroz III (Middle Persian: 𐭯𐭩𐭫𐭥𐭰, Pērōz; Middle Chinese: 卑路斯, Pje-loh-sie) was son of Yazdegerd III, the last King of Kings of Sasanian Iran. After the death of his father, who legend says was killed by a miller at the instigation of the governor of Merv, he took refuge in Tang China. He served as a Tang general and was given the title of Governor of Persia, an extension of the Sasanian court established in exile, under the suzerainty of Tang China. Most of what is known of Peroz III comes from the Old Book of Tang and the New Book of Tang.

== Life ==
Prince Peroz was born in 636, and was thus very young at the time of the reign of his father king Yazdegerd III and never exercised the imperial power of the Sasanians.

According to the Old Book of Tang, Peroz's father Yazdegerd III, requested military assistance from Tang China against the Arabs from 638 to 648, but each request was rejected by Emperor Taizong. In 654, Peroz sent envoys to the Tang Dynasty for aid, but was rejected by Emperor Gaozong. In 661, he again asked for military help. Emperor Gaozong dispatched a special envoy, Wang Mingyuan, to the Western Regions. Wang Mingyuan established the title Governor of Persia with Peroz as chief governor (都督 Dudu) and ruling from Jilingcheng (疾陵城) in what is now Zaranj/Zābol, on the modern border of Afghanistan and Iran, . 14 February 662, the Tang dynasty gave Peroz the title "King of Persia" (波斯王).

In 663, the remaining Persian forces in Afghanistan were finally eliminated by the Rashidun Caliphate, Peroz and the rest of the imperial family, including his brother Wahram escaped through the Pamir Mountains in what is now Tajikistan Between 670 and 674, Peroz arrived at the Tang court and was given the title of Yòuwǔwèi Jīangjūn (右武衛將軍, "Martial General of the Right [Flank] Guards"). The Emperor Gaozong of Tang allowed Sasanian refugees fleeing from the Arab invasion to settle in China.

In 678, Pei Xingjian, the minister of personnel (吏部侍郎) of the Tang court, was ordered to escort Peroz back to Persia, with the main task of squelching an insurgency of the vassalized Western Turkic Khan Ashina Duzhi. Pei Xingjian got as far as Suyab (in modern Kyrgyzstan) and then fought successfully against Ashina Duzhi, before considering the long distance to Persia thus leaving Peroz alone in the Anxi Protectorate, although he was still able to maintain his many servants. Minor Turkic chieftains in the region then pledged their loyalty to the Chinese dynasty due to the defeat of Ashina. The overall result of Pei's expedition was a success for the Tang empire. Upon returning to China, Pei was appointed the Minister of rituals and Great general of the right flank guards.

The Old Book of Tang recorded that Peroz, along with several thousand followers, spent over 20 years in Tuhuoluo (吐火羅; likely Tokharistan). In 708, he returned to the Tang court and was given the title of Zuoweiwei Jiangjun (左威衛將軍 Awe-inspiring General of the Left [Flank] Guards).

However, the biography of Pei Xingjian conflicts this account. It states that Pei, when briefing the political situation of Persia to Emperor Gaozong, said Peroz had died before the year of 678 and the Persian prince who was escorted back was Peroz's son Narsieh.

The New Book of Tang reconciles by stating that Peroz died during his first visit to Luoyang after receiving the title Youwuwei Jiangjun and it was Peroz's son, Narsieh, a hostage at the Tang court, was escorted by Pei Xingjian westwards to Persia in 679 (not 678) then spent 20 years in Tokhara. Finally, it was again Narsieh and not Peroz who received the title of Zuoweiwei Jiangjun.

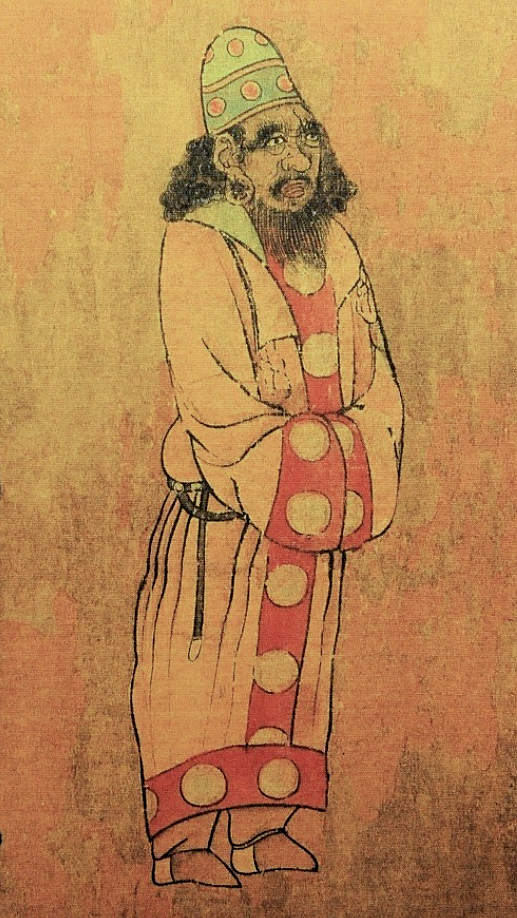
Ambassador from Persia (波斯國), visiting the court of the Tang dynasty. The Gathering of Kings (王会图), circa 650 CE

Statues of him and Nanmei (probably Wahram), were erected at the Mausoleum of Emperor Gaozong.

== Descendants ==
Narsieh adopted the Tang imperial family name Li.

A son of Peroz is attested during the anti-Umayyad uprising led by the Arab renegade Musa ibn Abd Allah ibn Khazim al-Sulami in 703–704, as being present in Tokharistan.

Peroz's son, Khosrau, is mentioned by the Arab historians as accompanying the Turgesh in their wars against the Arabs in Transoxiana. During the Siege of Kamarja in 729, he tried to achieve the surrender of the Arab garrison, but his offer was rejected with scorn.

== Sources ==
- Afkande, Ehsan (2014). "The Last Sasanians in Eastern Iran and China". Anabasis. Studia Classica et Orientalia.: 139–155.
- Bonner, Michael (2020). The Last Empire of Iran. New York: Gorgias Press. pp. 1–406. ISBN 978-1463206161.
- Compareti, Matteo (2009). "Chinese-Iranian relations xv. The last Sasanians in China". Encyclopaedia Iranica.
- Gibb, H. A. R. (1923). The Arab Conquests in Central Asia. London: The Royal Asiatic Society.
- Zanous, Hamidreza Pasha; Sangari, Esmaeil (2018). "The Last Sasanians in Chinese Literary Sources: Recently Identified Statue Head of a Sasanian Prince at the Qianling Mausoleum". Iranian Studies. 51 (4): 499–515. doi:10.1080/00210862.2018.1440966. S2CID 165568529.

Titles in pretence
Preceded by Yazdegerd III	— TITULAR — Sasanian King; 651–679; Reason for succession failure: Islamic conquest of Persia	Succeeded by Narsieh
