= Arab empire =

Arab empire or Arabian empire may refer to:

- Rashidun Caliphate
- Umayyad Caliphate
- Abbasid Caliphate
- Fatimid Caliphate

== See also ==
- Arabs
- Saracen
- Pan-Arabism
- Arab world
- Caliphate
- Arabian Peninsula
- List of Muslim states and dynasties, most notably:
  - Caliphate of Córdoba
  - Ayyubid dynasty
