= Yazdegerd III =

Last Sasanian King from 632 to 651

Yazdegerd III 𐭩𐭦𐭣𐭪𐭥𐭲𐭩
- King of Kings of Iranians and non-Iranians
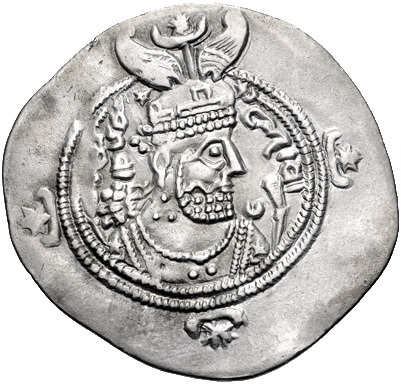
- Drachma of Yazdegerd III, minted in 651.

Shahanshah of the Sasanian Empire
- Reign: 16 June 632 – 651
- Coronation: Istakhr
- Predecessor: Boran
- Successor: Office abolished
- Rival: Khosrow IV (632–642)
- Born: 624; Istakhr
- Died: 651 (aged 27); Marw
- Issue: Peroz III; Bahram VII; Shahrbanu (alleged); Izdundad
- House: House of Sasan
- Father: Shahriyar
- Religion: Zoroastrianism

Yazdegerd III (also Romanized as Yazdgerd, Yazdgird) was the last Sasanian King of Kings from 632 to 651. His death following successive defeats by the Rashidun Caliphate marked the end of the last pre-Islamic Iranian empire after more than four centuries of rule.

The son of Sasanian prince Shahriyar and grandson of shah Khosrow II, Yazdegerd was installed on the throne at the age of eight shortly after the murder of his aunt, Boran. The young shah lacked authority and reigned as a figurehead while real power remained in the hands of army commanders, courtiers and powerful members of the aristocracy, who engaged in internecine warfare. The Sasanians, already severely weakened by these internal conflicts as well as the prolonged war with the Byzantines, also faced invasions by the Göktürks from the east and Khazars from the west.

Yazdegerd's empire was ultimately dealt a fatal blow by the ascending Rashidun Caliphate. Following a crushing defeat at al-Qadisiyyah and the fall of the imperial capital Ctesiphon, Yazdegerd fled from one province to another in the vain hope of raising an army to resist the advancing Arabs. He sought assistance from Tang China to no avail, while his arrogance and unrealistic demands increasingly alienated the war-weary margraves and populace. Yazdegerd was eventually killed by a miller near Merv in 651, possibly at the instigation of the local margrave.

== Etymology ==
'Yazdegerd' is a theophoric name that means 'God-made'. It is a combination of the Old Iranian yazad yazata- 'divine being' and karta- 'made'. It is comparable to Persian Bagkart and Greek Theoktistos. Yazdegerd is known in other languages as follows: Middle Persian—Yazdekert; New Persian—Yazd(e)gerd; Syriac—Yazdegerd, Izdegerd, and Yazdeger; Armenian—Yazkert; Talmudic Izdeger and Azger; Arabic—Yazdeijerd; Greek Isdigerdes.

== Background ==
Yazdegerd was the son of prince Shahriyar and the grandson of Khosrow II (r. 590–628), the last prominent shah of Iran. Khosrow II had been overthrown and executed in 628 by his own son Sheroe, who took the name Kavad II upon gaining the throne. Kavad then ordered the execution of all his brothers and half-brothers, including Yazdegerd's father Shahriyar. The purging of the ranks of the ruling family dealt a blow to the empire from which it would never recover.

The murder of Khosrow II ignited a civil war that lasted four years, as the most powerful members of the nobility created their own autonomous government. Hostilities between the Persian (Parsig) and Parthian (Pahlav) noble families also resumed; they divided the treasury between themselves. And months later, a devastating plague swept through the western Sasanian provinces and killed half of the population. Kavad II was one of its victims.

Kavad was succeeded by his eight-year-old son Ardashir III who was killed two years later by the distinguished Sasanian general Shahrbaraz. Forty days later Shahrbaraz was deposed and murdered by the Pahlav leader Farrukh Hormizd, who installed the daughter of Khosrow II, Boran, on the throne. She was deposed a year later, and a succession of rulers followed until Boran was sovereign once more in 631, only to be murdered the following year by the Parsig leader Piruz Khosrow.

Eventually the two most powerful magnates in the empire, Rostam Farrokhzad (Note: Rostam Farrokhzad was a son of Farrukh Hormizd, and had succeeded him as the leader of the Pahlav in 631, when the latter was killed after attempting to usurp the Sasanian throne.) and Piruz Khosrow—threatened by their own men—agreed to ally. They installed Yazdegerd III on the throne, putting an end to the civil war. He was crowned in the Temple of Anahita, Istakhr, where he had been hiding during the civil war. The site was chosen to be a symbol of the empire's rejuvenation, as it was the very place where the first Sasanian shah Ardashir I (r. 224–242) had crowned himself four centuries earlier. Due to Kavad's massacre of his family, the new shah was among the few surviving members of the House of Sasan. Most scholars agree that Yazdegerd was eight years old at his coronation. His coronation occurred around the same time that Abu Bakr became Caliph.

== Early reign and instability ==
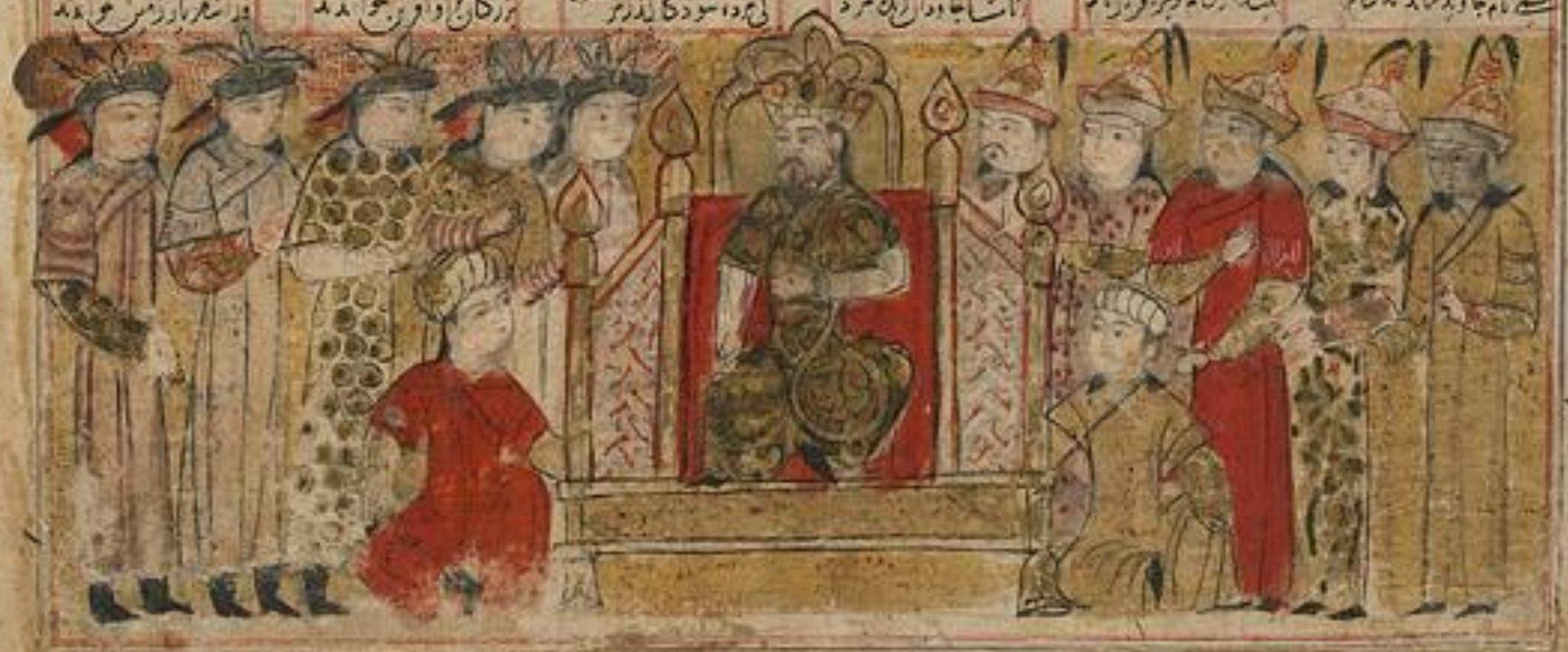
14th-century Shahnameh illustration of the coronation of Yazdegerd III, who is incorrectly portrayed as an adult.

The eight-year-old Yazdegerd lacked the authority needed to bring stability to an empire that was quickly falling apart due to ceaseless internal conflict. Army commanders, courtiers, and powerful members of the aristocracy fought amongst each other in feuds that were often deadly. Many regional governors had proclaimed their independence from the crown and carved out their own kingdoms. The governors of the provinces of Mazun and Yemen had already asserted their independence during the civil war of 628–632, resulting in the disintegration of Sasanian rule over the Arab tribes of the Arabian Peninsula who had united under the banner of Islam. The Iranologist Khodadad Rezakhani argues that the Sasanians had likely already lost many of their possessions after Khosrow II's overthrow in 628.

By 632, the Sasanian state resembled the feudal system of the Parthian Empire at its collapse in 224. Yazdegerd, though acknowledged by both the Parsig and Pahlav factions as the rightful monarch, was not in control of the empire. Indeed, during the first years of his rule the Pahlav, based in the north, refused to mint coins of him.

His coins were minted in Pars, Sakastan, and Khuzestan, approximately corresponding to the regions of the southwest (Xwarwarān) and southeast (Nēmrōz), where the Parsig was based. In the south, a Sasanian claimant to the throne who called himself Khosrow IV minted his own coinage at Susa in Khuzestan; he would do so till 636. According to Rezakhani, Yazdegerd also lost control over Mesopotamia and the imperial capital Ctesiphon. He argues that the conspiring aristocrats and the population of Ctesiphon "do not appear to have been too successful or eager in bringing Yazdgerd to the capital."

The empire was being invaded on two fronts; by the Göktürks in the east and by Khazars in the west. The Khazars raided Armenia and Adurbadagan. The Sasanian army had been heavily weakened due to the war with the Byzantines and to its continuous internal conflict. The circumstances were so chaotic, and the condition of the state so alarming, that "the Persians openly spoke of the imminent downfall of their empire, and saw its portents in natural calamities."

== Early clash with the Arabs ==
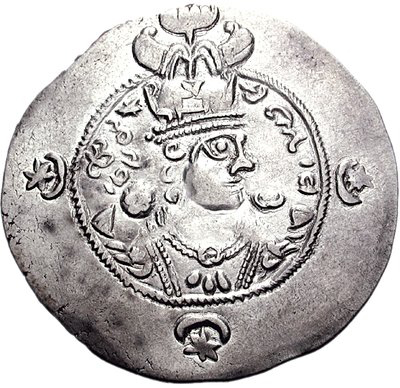
Drachma of a young Yazdegerd III.

In 633 Muslim Arabs defeated a Sasanian force under Azadbeh near the strategically important Sasanian city Hira, which the victors then occupied in short order. Yazdegerd's ministers began paying heed to the Muslims after the loss of Hira. Rostam Farrokhzad sent an army commanded by Bahman Jadhuyih and the Armenian Jalinus to face the enemy. Rostam ordered Bahman to return with Jalinus's head if the Armenian general lost. The Sasanian army managed to defeat the Muslims at the Battle of the Bridge.

In 636 Yazdegerd ordered Rostam to subdue the invading Arabs, telling him "Today you are the [most prominent] man among the Iranians...[T]he people of Iran have not faced a situation like this since the family of Ardashir I assumed power." Notwithstanding this speech, advisors asked Yazdegerd to dismiss Rostam and replace him with someone more popular and around whom the people would rally.

Yazdegerd ordered Rostam to assess the Arab forces camped at Qadisiyyah. Rostam reported that the Arabs were "a pack of wolves, falling upon unsuspecting shepherds and annihilating them." Yazdegerd responded to Rostam thus:

It is not like that. The Arabs and the Persians are comparable to an eagle who looked upon a mountain where birds take shelter at night and stay in their nests at the foot of it. When morning came, the birds looked around and saw that he was watching them. Whenever a bird became separated from the rest, the eagle snatched him. The worst thing that could happen to them would be that all would escape save one.

== Last stand ==
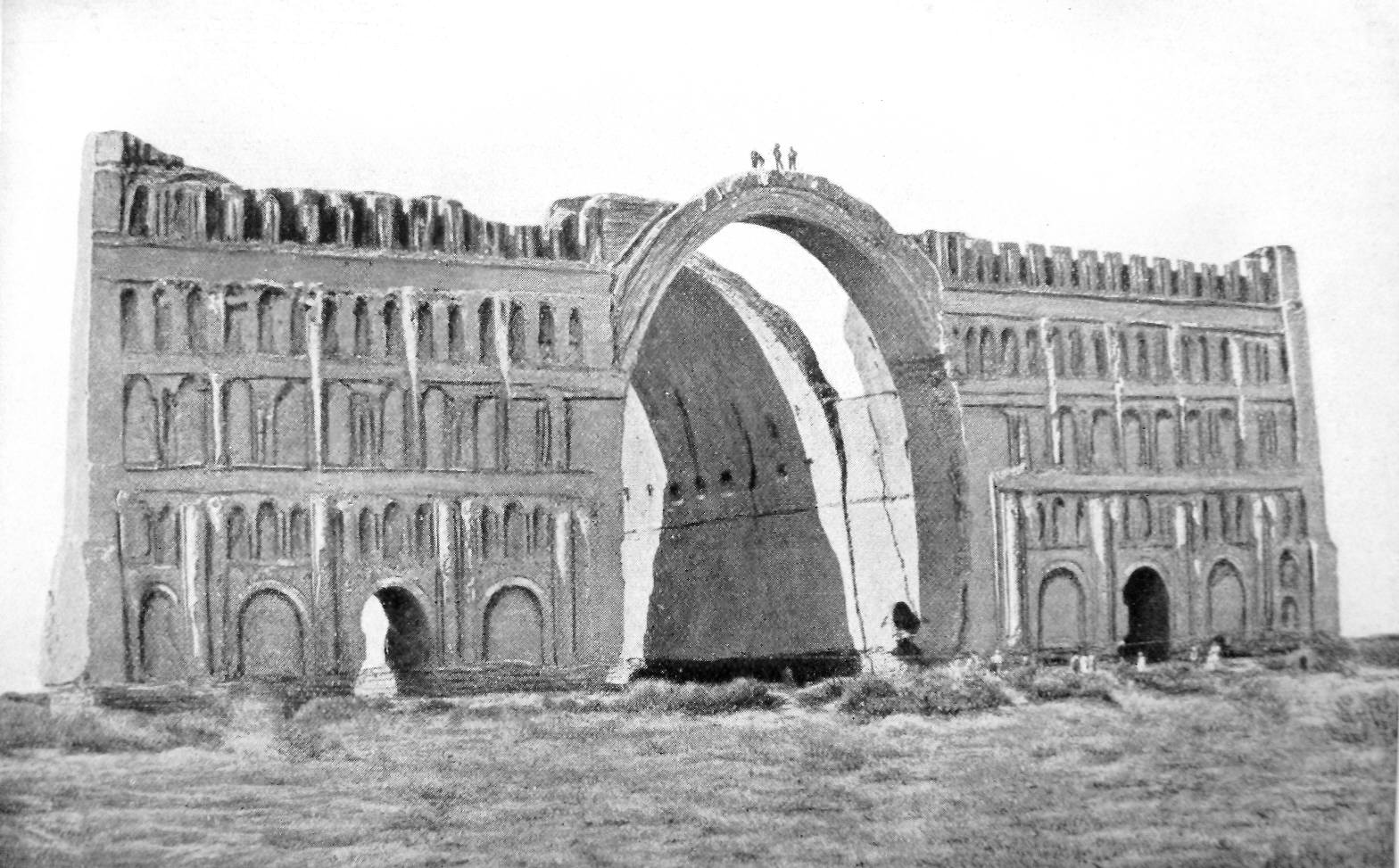
The Palace of Taq Kisra in the Sasanian capital Ctesiphon. The city was a rich commercial metropolis, and may have been the most populous city of the world in 570–622.

The two armies clashed again 636. The Battle of al-Qadisiyyah resulted in a crushing defeat for the Sasanian army. Rostam, Bahman Jaduya, Jalinus, and the Armenian princes Grigor II Novirak and Mushegh III Mamikonian were all slain in the fighting. The Arabs then headed for the imperial capital Ctesiphon, meeting no resistance along the way. Yazdegerd fled with the treasury and 1,000 servants to Hulwan in Media, leaving Rostam's brother Farrukhzad in charge of the capital. But rather than stay and fight the Arabs, Farrukhzad also fled to Hulwan. The Arabs reached Ctesiphon in 637, besieged the western parts of the city, and soon occupied all of it.

The Iranian defeat at al-Qadisiyyah has often been described as a turning point in the Arab invasion of Iran. The Iranians had finally become cognizant of the destructive consequences of their factionalism and internecine feuding. Al-Tabari wrote that after the fall of Ctesiphon "the people... were about to go their separate ways, [but] they started to incite one another: 'If you disperse now, you will never get together again; this is a spot that sends us in different directions'."

In 637 Arabs defeated another Sasanian army at the Battle of Jalula, and Yazdegerd fled deeper into Media. He raised a new army there and ordered it to Nahavand to retake Ctesiphon in the hope of preventing Muslim advances. The threat presented by the new army prompted Umar to combine his Arab forces. He ordered Al-Nu’man ibn Muqrin to take command of the armies of Kufa and Basra, with additional reinforcements from Syria and Oman.

In 642 this massive army attacked the Sasanians. The ensuing Battle of Nahavand is said to have lasted several days, with major losses on both sides. The dead included al-Nu'man ibn Muqrin and the Iranian generals Mardanshah and Piruz Khosrow. It marked a second military disaster for the Sasanians, six years after the crushing defeat at al-Qadisiyyah in 636.

== Flight ==
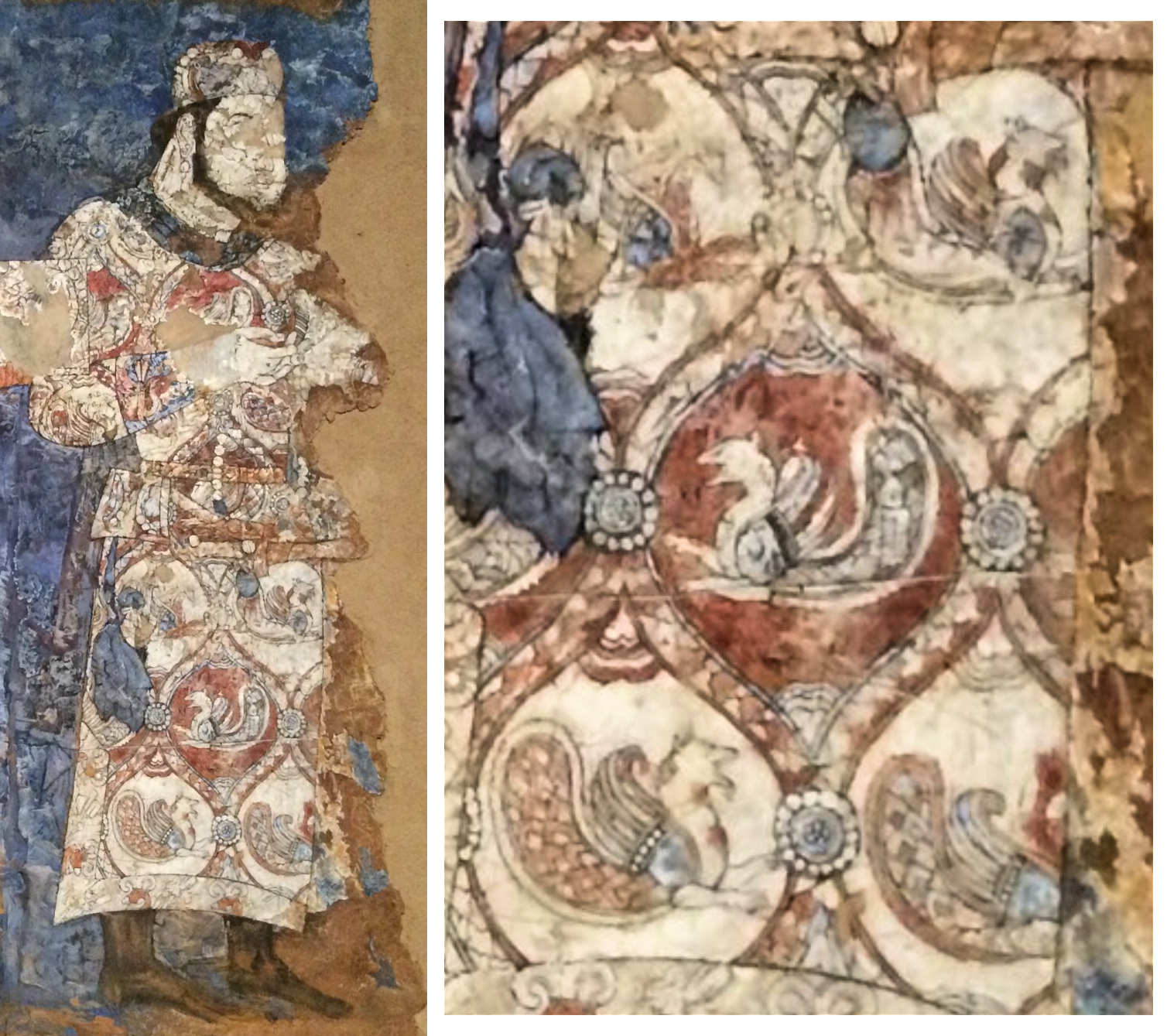
It has been suggested that a foreign visitor at the court of king Varkhuman of Samarkand in 648-651 AD, clad in sumptuous dress with Simurgh symbols, may be Yazdegerd III. Afrasiab murals, 648-651 AD.

In the aftermath of the debacle at Nahavand, Yazdegerd fled to Isfahan where he raised a small army. He placed it under the command of an officer named Siyah who had lost property to the Arabs. But Siyah and his troops also agreed to fight for the Arabs in exchange for places to live and mutinied against Yazdegerd. Meanwhile, Yazdegerd had arrived in Istakhr where he tried to establish a base of resistance in Pars Province. But in 650, the governor of Arab-controlled Basra, Abdullah ibn Aamir, invaded Pars and put an end to the Persian resistance. 40,000 Iranian defenders were slain—many of them nobles—and Istakhr was left in ruins. Following the Arab conquest of Pars, Yazdegerd fled to Kirman, pursued by an Arab force. Yazdegerd managed to flee from the Arabs in a snowstorm at Bimand.

In Kirman, Yazdegerd managed to alienate the marzban (frontier military governor or "margrave"), before leaving for Sakastan. Then another Arab army from Basra arrived at Kirman. A fierce battle ensued in which the marzban was slain. And Yazdegerd alienated the governor of Sakastan with his demands for more and higher taxes to fund the army. Yazdegerd next embarked to Merv to meet the leader of the Turks in the hope of forming an alliance. But when he reached Khorasan, the war-weary populace insisted on peace with the Arabs, and Yazdegerd refused. In 650–652, an Arab army entered Sakastan and captured the city. Yazdegerd did secure the troops from the Principality of Chaghaniyan. He made the same demands on the marzban of Merv that he had made in Kirman and Sakastan and met with the same results. The marzban joined with Nezak Tarkan, the Hephthalite ruler of Badghis, and together they defeated Yazdegerd and his followers.

== Chinese assistance ==
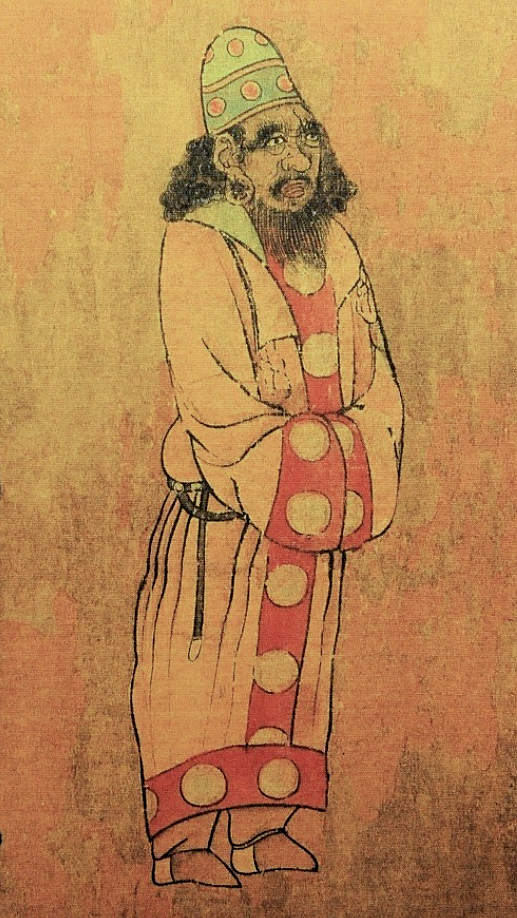
Ambassador from Persia (波斯國), visiting the court of the Tang dynasty. The Gathering of Kings (王会图), c. 650 AD

Yazdegerd had sent an envoy to the Chinese emperor seeking assistance in 638 after his first defeat to the Arabs, but nothing seems to have come of the visit. He sent another envoy to the Tang dynasty court in 639 "for offering tribute”. Yazdegerd continued to send envoys to China in 647 and 648, even as he suffered defeats, in order to “seek assistance from the Chinese court with the hope to form a new army". The Chinese did eventually send assistance, but only after Yazdegerd was dead. His son Peroz III again sent envoys in 654 and 661. Following the second of these embassies, the Chinese established a "Persian military commandery" (波斯都督府) in 661 in the city of Zābol (疾陵城 Jilingcheng) in Tokharistan, and Peroz was appointed as Military Commander (都督 Dudu). In 679 a Chinese army accompanied Narsieh, the exiled son of Peroz, with orders to restore him to the Sasanian throne. But the army was detained in Tokharistan to repel the invasion of Western Turkic Khan Ashina Duzhi, which left Narsieh to fight against the Muslim Arabs without Chinese assistance for the next twenty years. Yazdegard III's grandson Prince Khosrau, son of Bahram VII (recorded as Juluo (Chinese: 俱羅; pinyin: Jū Luó) in Chinese sources) attempted to continue his father's military efforts. He is likely the same "Khosrow" mentioned by al-Tabari. Khosrau's campaigns, and his first invasion of Persia, proved unsuccessful.

== Death, legacy and personality ==
After his defeat in 651, Yazdegerd sought refuge with a miller near Merv. Rather than sheltering Yazdegerd, the miller murdered him. According to Kia, the miller killed Yazdegerd for his jewelry, whilst The Cambridge History of Iran states that the miller was sent by Mahoe Suri.

Mahoe sends the miller to cut off his head on pain of losing his own, and having none of his race left alive. His chiefs hear this and cry out against him, and a mowbed of the name of Radui tells him that to kill a king or prophet will bring evil upon him and his son, and is supported in what he says by a holy man of the name of Hormuzd Kharad Shehran, and Mehronush. The miller most unwillingly goes in and stabs him with a dagger in the middle. Mahoe's horsemen all go and see him and take off his clothing and ornaments, leaving him on the ground. All the nobles curse Mahoe and wish him the same fate.

— Ferdowsi narrating the fate of the Yazdegerd in his Shahnameh

The death of Yazdegerd marked the end of the Sasanian Empire, and made it easier for the Arabs to conquer the rest of Iran. All of Khorasan was soon conquered by the Arabs, who would use it as a base to attack Transoxiana. The death of Yazdegerd thus marked the end of the last pre-Islamic Iranian empire after more than 400 years of rule. The empire—which had a generation earlier conquered Egypt and Asia Minor, reaching as a far as Constantinople—fell to a force of lightly-equipped Arabs used to skirmishes and desert warfare. The heavy Sasanian cavalry was too sluggish and systematized to contain them; employing light-armed Arab or East Iranian mercenaries from Khorasan and Transoxiana would have been more effective.

Yazdegerd was according to tradition buried by Christian monks in Merv, in a tall tomb situated in a garden and decorated with silk and musk. A funeral and mausoleum were organized by Church of the East bishop Elias of Merv in honor of Yazdegerd's Christian grandmother Shirin. For his part in the murder of the Sassanian king, Mahoe had his arms, legs, ears and nose cut off by the Turks, who eventually left him to die under the scorching summer sun. The corpse of Mahoe was then burned at the stake, along with the bodies of his three sons.

According to one tradition, the monks cursed Mahoe and made a hymn to Yazdegerd, mourning the fall of a "combative" king and the "house of Ardashir I". Whether the tradition was factual or not, it emphasizes that the Christians of the empire remained loyal to the Zoroastrian Sasanians, even possibly more than the Iranian nobles who had deserted Yazdegerd. Indeed, there were close links between the late Sasanian rulers and Christians, whose conditions had greatly improved compared to that of the early Sasanian era. Yazdegerd's wife was according to folklore a Christian, whilst his son and heir, Peroz III was seemingly an adherent of Christianity, and had a church built in China where he had taken refuge. Yazdegerd became remembered in history as a martyred prince; many rulers and officers of Islamic Iran would claim descent from him.

Yazdegerd was well-educated and cultured, but his arrogance, pride and inability to compare his demands with the real situation led to his constantly falling out with his governors and to his influence diminishing as he, pursued by Arabs, moved from one city to another. At each new place, he behaved as if he was still the all-powerful monarch of the kingdom and not an outcast running away from enemies. Combined with his military failures, this arrogance turned many of his most loyal subjects away from him.

== Zoroastrian calendar ==
The Zoroastrian religious calendar, which is still in use today, uses the regnal year of Yazdegerd III as its base year, and its calendar era (year numbering system) is accompanied by a Y.Z. suffix.

Magians took Yazdegerd III's death as the end of the millennium of Zoroaster and the beginning of the millennium of Oshetar (see "Saoshyant").

== See also ==
- Death of Yazdgerd (film)
- Death of Yazdgerd (play)

== Sources ==
- Compareti, Matteo (2009). "Chinese-Iranian relations xv. The last Sasanians in China". In Yarshater, Ehsan (ed.). Encyclopædia Iranica (Online ed.). Encyclopædia Iranica Foundation.
- Daryaee, Touraj (2010). "When the End is Near: Barbarized Armies and Barracks Kings of Late Antique Iran". Ancient and Middle Iranian studies: proceedings of the 6th European Conference of Iranian Studies, held in Vienna, 18–22 September 2007. Vol. Iranica. Harrassowitz. pp. 43–52. ISBN 9783447064224.
- Daryaee, Touraj (2014). Sasanian Persia: The Rise and Fall of an Empire. I.B. Tauris. pp. 1–240. ISBN 978-0857716668.
- Frye, R. N. (1983). "The Political History of Iran under the Sasanians". The Cambridge History of Iran. Vol. 3. Cambridge University Press. ISBN 978-0-521-20092-9.
- Karaka, Dosabhai Framji (1884). History of the Parsis: including their manners, customs, religion, and present position. Vol. I. Macmillan. ISBN 0-404-12812-2.
- Kennedy, Hugh N. (2004). The Prophet and the Age of the Caliphates: The Islamic Near East from the 6th to the 11th Century (Second ed.). Harlow, UK: Pearson Education. ISBN 0-582-40525-4.
- Kia, Mehrdad (2016). The Persian Empire: A Historical Encyclopedia [2 volumes]. ABC-CLIO. ISBN 978-1610693912.
- Morony, M. (1986). "ʿArab ii. Arab conquest of Iran". In Yarshater, Ehsan (ed.). Encyclopædia Iranica. Vol. II/2: Anthropology–ʿArab Moḥammad (Online ed.). Encyclopædia Iranica Foundation. pp. 203–210.
- Payne, Richard E. (2015). A State of Mixture: Christians, Zoroastrians, and Iranian Political Culture in Late Antiquity. University of California Press. ISBN 978-0520961531.
- Pourshariati, Parvaneh (2008). Decline and Fall of the Sasanian Empire: The Sasanian-Parthian Confederacy and the Arab Conquest of Iran. London and New York: I.B. Tauris. ISBN 978-1-84511-645-3.
- Rezakhani, Khodadad (2019). "The End of Sasanian Rule: The Center and Periphery of Ērānšahr in the Seventh Century". Studi Sulla Persia Sasanide e Suoi Rapporti Con la Civilta Attigue. Princeton University: 229–255.
- Shahbazi, A. Shapur (1986). "Army i. Pre-Islamic Iran". In Yarshater, Ehsan (ed.). Encyclopædia Iranica. Vol. II/5: Armenia and Iran IV–Art in Iran I (Online ed.). Encyclopædia Iranica Foundation. pp. 489–499.
- Shahbazi, A. Shapur (2003). "Yazdegerd I". In Yarshater, Ehsan (ed.). Encyclopædia Iranica (Online ed.). Encyclopædia Iranica Foundation.
- Shahbazi, A. Shapur (2005). "Sasanian dynasty". In Yarshater, Ehsan (ed.). Encyclopædia Iranica (Online ed.). Encyclopædia Iranica Foundation.
- al-Tabari (1993). The Challenge to the Empires. Translated by Khalid Yahya Blankinship. State University of New York Press. p. 222. ISBN 0-7914-0852-3.
- al-Tabari (1992). The Battle of al-Qadisiyyah and the Conquest of Syria and Palestine. Translated by Yohanan Friedmann. Albany: State University of New York Press. ISBN 0-7914-0734-9.
- Zarrinkub, Abd al-Husain (1975). "The Arab Conquest of Iran and its Aftermath". The Cambridge History of Iran, Volume 4: From the Arab Invasion to the Saljuqs. Cambridge University Press. pp. 1–57. ISBN 978-0-521-20093-6.

Yazdegerd III Sasanian dynasty Born: 624 Died: 651
Preceded by Boran	King of Kings of Iran and non-Iran; 632–651	Succeeded by Sasanian Empire abolished
