= Bahram VII =

Sasanian noble

- Born: Sasanian Empire
- Died: 710; Luoyang, Tang China
- Issue: Khosrow / Juluo
- House: House of Sasan
- Father: Yazdegerd III
- Religion: Zoroastrianism

Bahram VII (Middle Persian: Wahrām) was the son of Yazdegerd III, the last Shahanshah of the Sasanian Empire. After the death of his father at Merv in 651, Bahram fled to China along with many other Sasanian nobles, where he and his brother Peroz III asked the Chinese Emperor Gaozong to support them in their fight against the Arabs. Bahram repeatedly tried to recapture the occupied Iranian territories from the Arabs, but he was unsuccessful.

Some identify the aristocrat Aluohan (Chinese: 阿羅憾) as Bahram VII. According to a Chinese scholar, the so-called Nanmei (Chinese: 南昧), whose statue was erected together with that of Peroz III in Qianling Mausoleum, should be identified with Aluohan.

The figure Wahrām-ī-Warȷā̌wand in late Pahlavi literature may point to Bahram VII.

Bahram died in 710 in his private domicile in Luoyang.

Bahram VII's son, Prince Khosrau, recorded as Juluo (Chinese: 俱羅; pinyin: Jū Luó) in Chinese sources, continued his father's military efforts. However, Khosrau's campaigns and his invasion of Persia were ultimately unsuccessful. He is probably the same Khosrow mentioned by al-Tabari.

== Sources ==
- Touraj Daryaee: Sasanian Iran. Mazda Publishers, California, 2008, ISBN 1568591691, S. 91–104.
- D. N. MacKenzie: A Concise Pahlavi Dictionary. Routledge Curzon, ISBN 0197135595, 2005.
