= Mohammadpur Government High School =

- মোহাম্মদপুর সরকারি উচ্চ বিদ্যালয়
- Official logo

Location
- Humayan Road; Mohammadpur Thana; Dhaka, 1207; Bangladesh; 23.7675°N 90.3638°E

Information
- Type: Public school
- Motto: সকলের জন্য শিক্ষা (Education For All)
- Established: 1967
- School district: Dhaka
- Headmaster: Anowar Hossain
- Grades: 1–10
- Gender: Boys
- Age range: 5-18
- Language: Bengali
- EIIN number: 108232
- Website: www.mghs.edu.bd

Mohammadpur Government High School (Bengali: মোহাম্মদপুর সরকারি উচ্চ বিদ্যালয়, also known as MGHS) is one of the oldest public schools located in Dhaka, Bangladesh. The institution offers primary and secondary education for boys.

== History ==
The school was established in 1967 and follows the National Curriculum and Textbook Board in the medium of Bengali.

== Structure ==
The school enrolls students from Class 1 to 10. The school operates in two shifts: Morning and Day. Students of Class 1 to 10 can read in the Morning shift. But in Day shift, it is only for Class 6 to 10. There is an additional non governmental section in the school for class 1 to 5. The students pass from the additional shift, can directly admit in the Day shift. Every year about approximately 500 students appear in the PEC, JSC & SSC examination, with about half in Science, and half in Business Studies.

== Admission ==
Under the control of Directorate General of Secondary and Higher Education, Dhaka admission lotteries of all the government schools of Dhaka city are taken. There is no intense competition in the admission process. Students are selected to study at this school by lottery. Usually students are admitted in classes 1,6 and 9. Admission can be considered in other classes if a vacancy is created. The admission test is taken usually in December after the annual exam.

== Guardian teacher conference ==
A conference is called where students discuss the problems of a student and how to remove those, which may contribute to this school performing will in PEC, JSC & SSC.

== School magazine ==
The school magazine is UDDIPON (উদ্দীপন). It is published every four years rather than annually. The magazine records aspects of the school's activities and development and includes contributions by students. Students also participate in games and athletics, art and craft, science clubs, dramatics and other activities. Debates, elocution and essay-writing competitions are less common. The magazine includes material relating to school activities and student work.

== Extracurricular activities ==
- Sports: The students of MGHS are active in sports. The annual sports competition is organized by the school authority in February each year. Sprints (100 to 400 meters), long jump, and high jump are few to mention among different kinds of sports in which students participate. The students of MGHS take part in Inter-School Cricket, Football, Kabaddi, and Rugby Tournaments.
- Cultural Program: A 'Cultural Program' is observed every year in the school. In which, students can explore the talents inside them.
- Debate: The students of MGHS takes part in different debate competitions.
- Math Olympiad: The students of the school takes part in National Mathematics Olympiad.
- Science Fair: The science loving students of MGHS takes part in different science fairs and other science-based tournaments.
- National Programs: The students in-general as well as the Scouts, the Red Crescents and the Cadets take part in different national programs.

=== Clubs ===
- Mohammadpur Government High School Scouts Group
- Bangladesh Red Crescent Society
- Bangladesh National Cadet Corps (BNCC)
- MGHS Band Team
- MGHS Science Club
- MGHS Debating Club

MGHS Football Club

== List of headmasters ==
- M. Imran Ali (February 14, 1967 to May 25, 1968)
- Shams Uddin Ahmed (June 22, 1968 to December 31, 1977)
- Amir Ali (December 31, 1977 to February 28, 1978)
- Md. Motiur Rahman (March 20, 1978 to February 12, 1984)
- Begum Hamida Khatun (February 12, 1984 to July 31, 1988)
- Shirajul Islam (August 1, 1988 to September 29, 1989)
- Md. Johirul Haque (September 30, 1989 to April 29, 1991)
- Md. Sikandar Ali Khalifa (May 26, 1991 to October 12, 1995)
- Muhammad Shahidur Rahman (October 12, 1995 to October 28, 1999)
- A.K.M. Mustafa Kamal (November 2, 1999 to June 26, 2002)
- Rehana Khanom (June 27, 2002 to October 8, 2007)
- Md. Bengir Ahmed (October 8, 2007 to November 22, 2014)
- Azhar Uddin Ahmed (November 25, 2014 - September, 2015)
- Abul Kalam Mustafa (September, 2015 - August, 2017)
- Nurun Nahar (August, 2017– October 2021)
- Gouro Chandra Mandal (October, 2021 -June,2024)
- Anowar Hossain (June,2024–Present)

== Notable alumni ==
- General Aziz Ahmed, Chief of Army Staff of the Bangladesh Army
- Md. Abul Kashem Mia — Vice-Chancellor of United International University.
- Sadi Mohammad — Bangladeshi Rabindra Sangeet singer and composer
- Shibli Mohammad — Bangladeshi dancer and choreographer
- Taskin Ahmed — Bangladeshi international cricketer.

== See also ==
- High schools in Bangladesh
- Education in Bangladesh
