= Vatara Thana =

Vatara ভাটারা
- Thana
- Bhatara
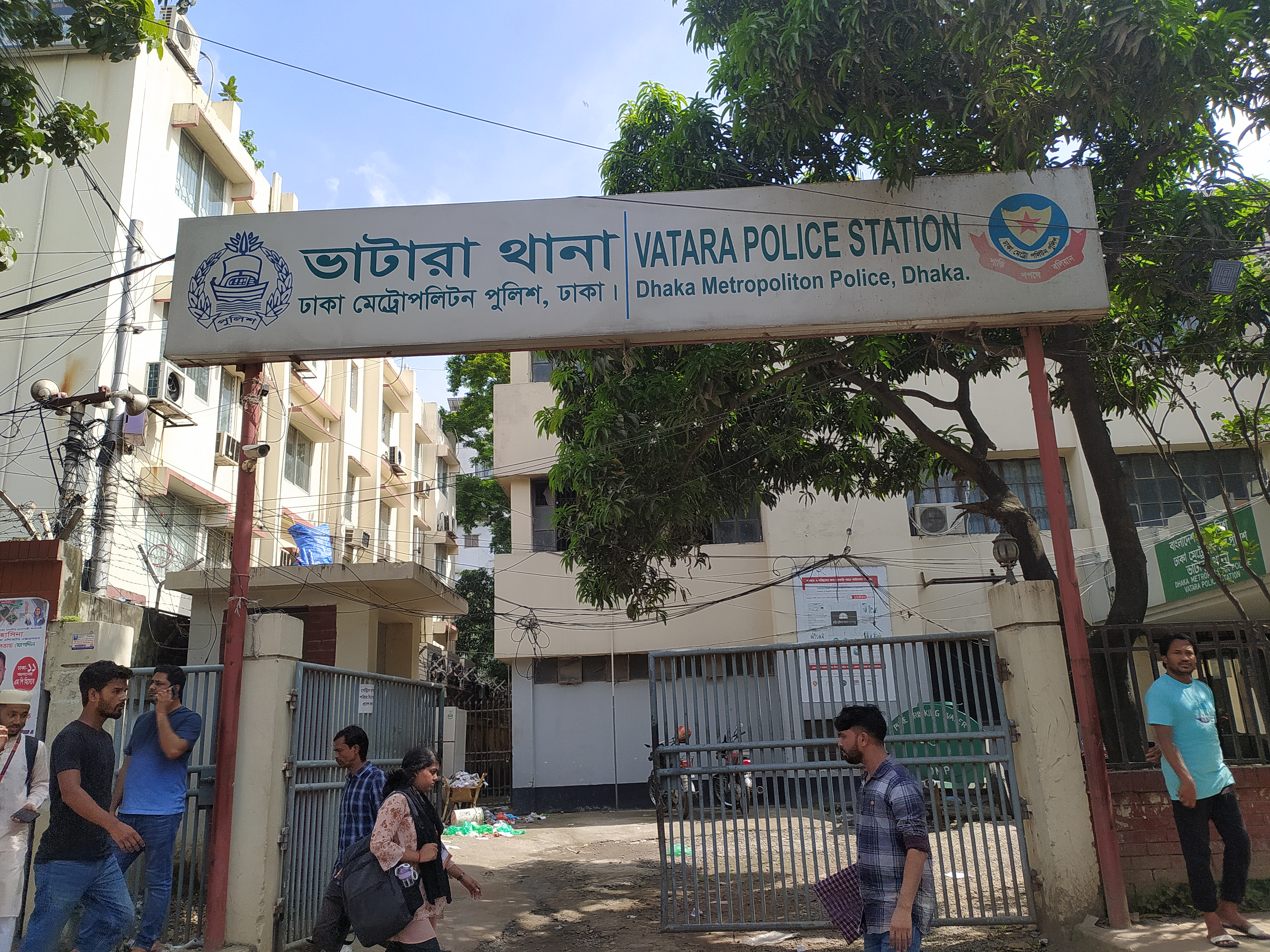
- Vatara Police Station

- Location in Bangladesh Vatara (Dhaka division)
- Coordinates: 23°48′N 90°26′E
- Country: Bangladesh
- Division: Dhaka Division
- District: Dhaka District

Area
  - Total: 7.64 km^{2} (2.95 sq mi)

Population (2022)
  - Total: 324,300
- Time zone: UTC+6 (BST)
- Postal code: 1212
- Area code: 02

Vatara Thana is a thana of Dhaka city, the capital of Bangladesh. Its neighbourhoods include Sayeed Nagar, Baridhara, Vatara, Solmaid, Nurerchala, Khilbarirtek, Kalachandpur, and Kuril.

Key roads passing through this thana include Progoti Sarani, and Madani Avenue, a 100-foot-wide (30 m) road connecting it to Rupganj Upazila of Narayanganj.

Part of this thana is encompassed by ward number 40 of Dhaka North City Corporation.

== Demographics ==
Religions in Bhatara Thana (2022)
Religion	Percent
Islam	94.88%
Hinduism	3.60%
Christianity	1.31%
Other or not stated	0.20%

According to the 2022 Bangladeshi census, Bhatara Thana had 91,275 households and a population of 324,304. 7.32% of the population were under 5 years of age. Bhatara had a literacy rate (age 7 and over) of 86.56%: 88.07% for males and 84.54% for females, and a sex ratio of 130.05 males for every 100 females.

== Gallery ==
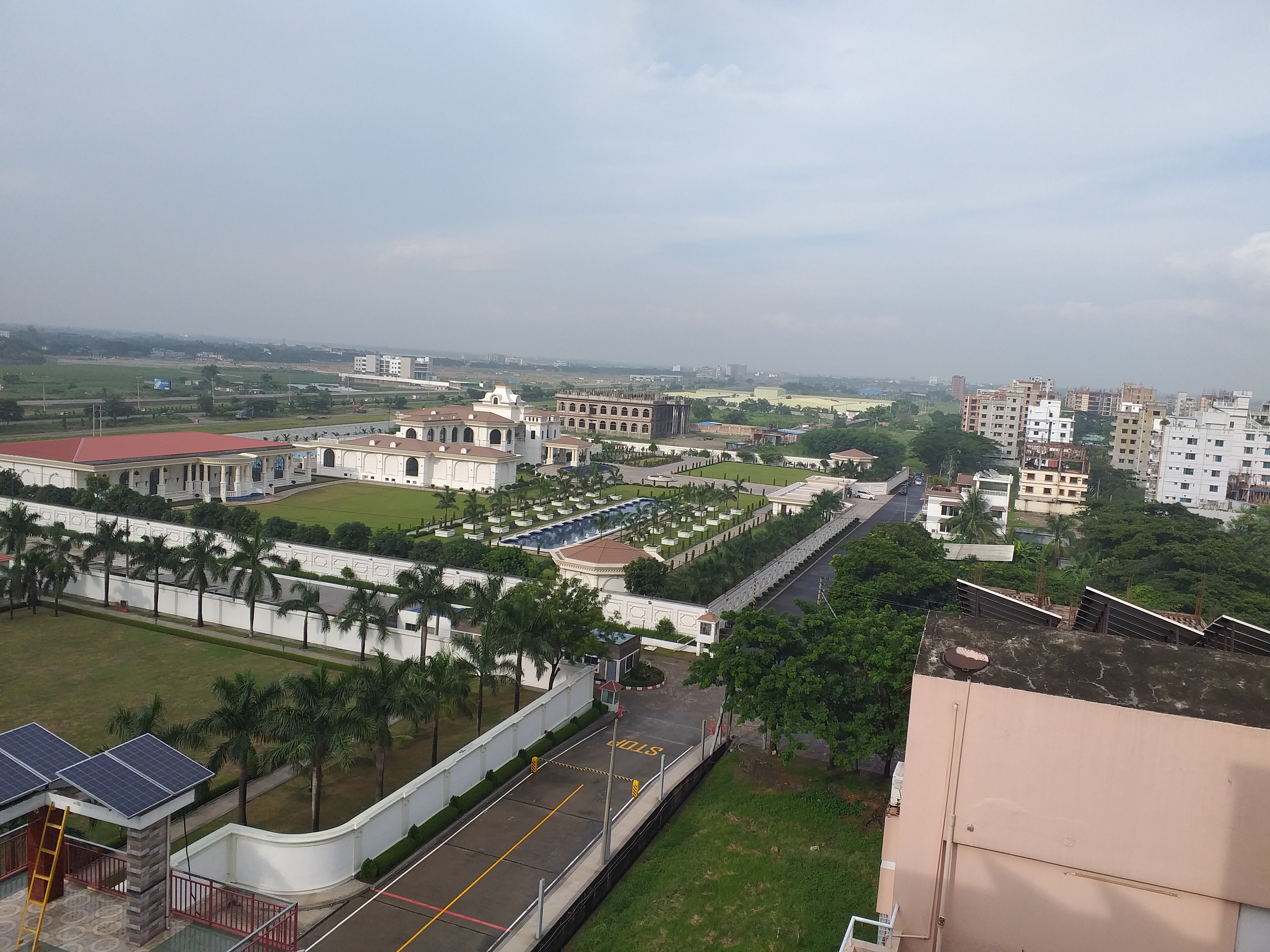
A view of Bashundhara residential area.

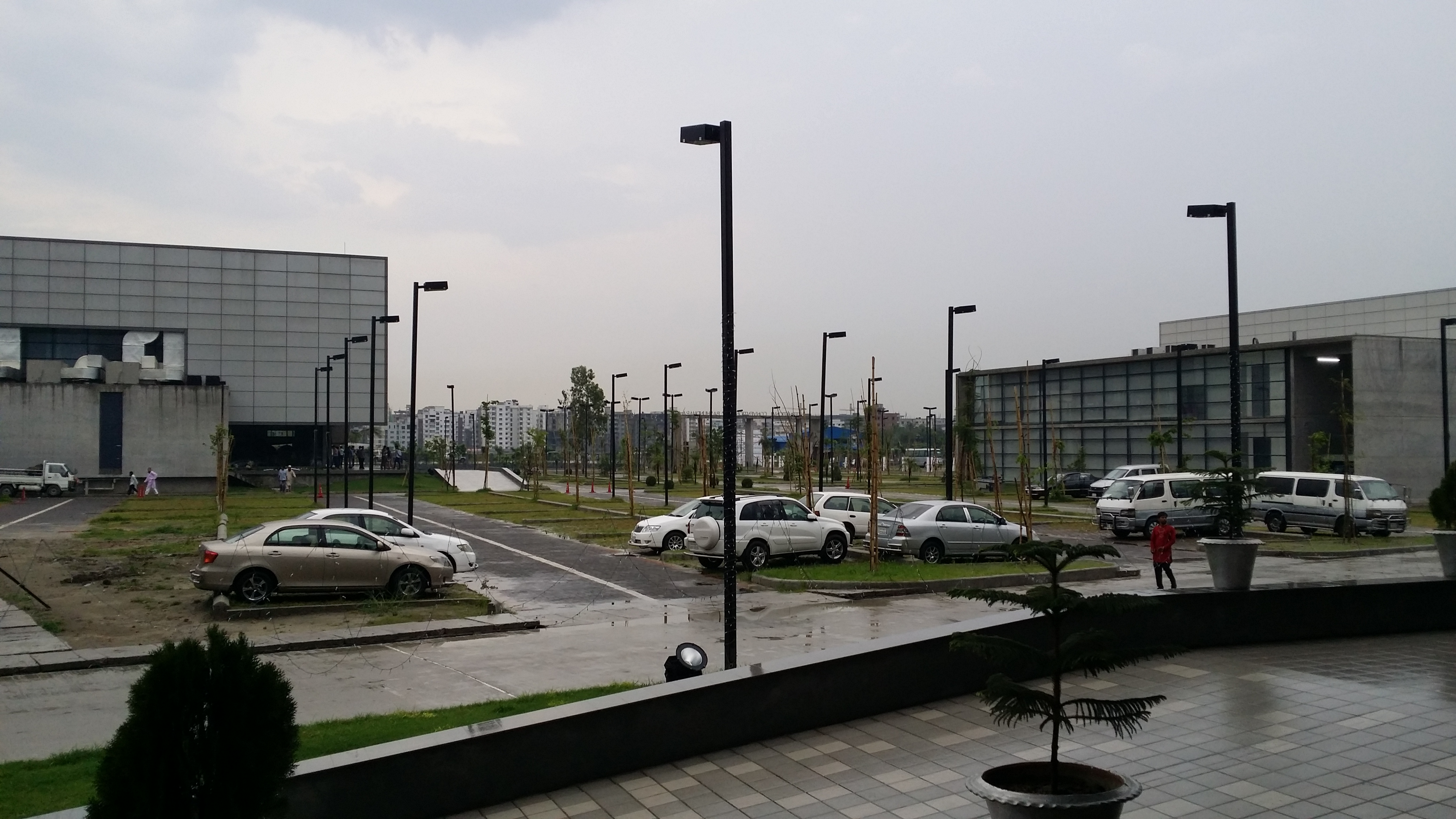
Convention center on Bashundhara zone.

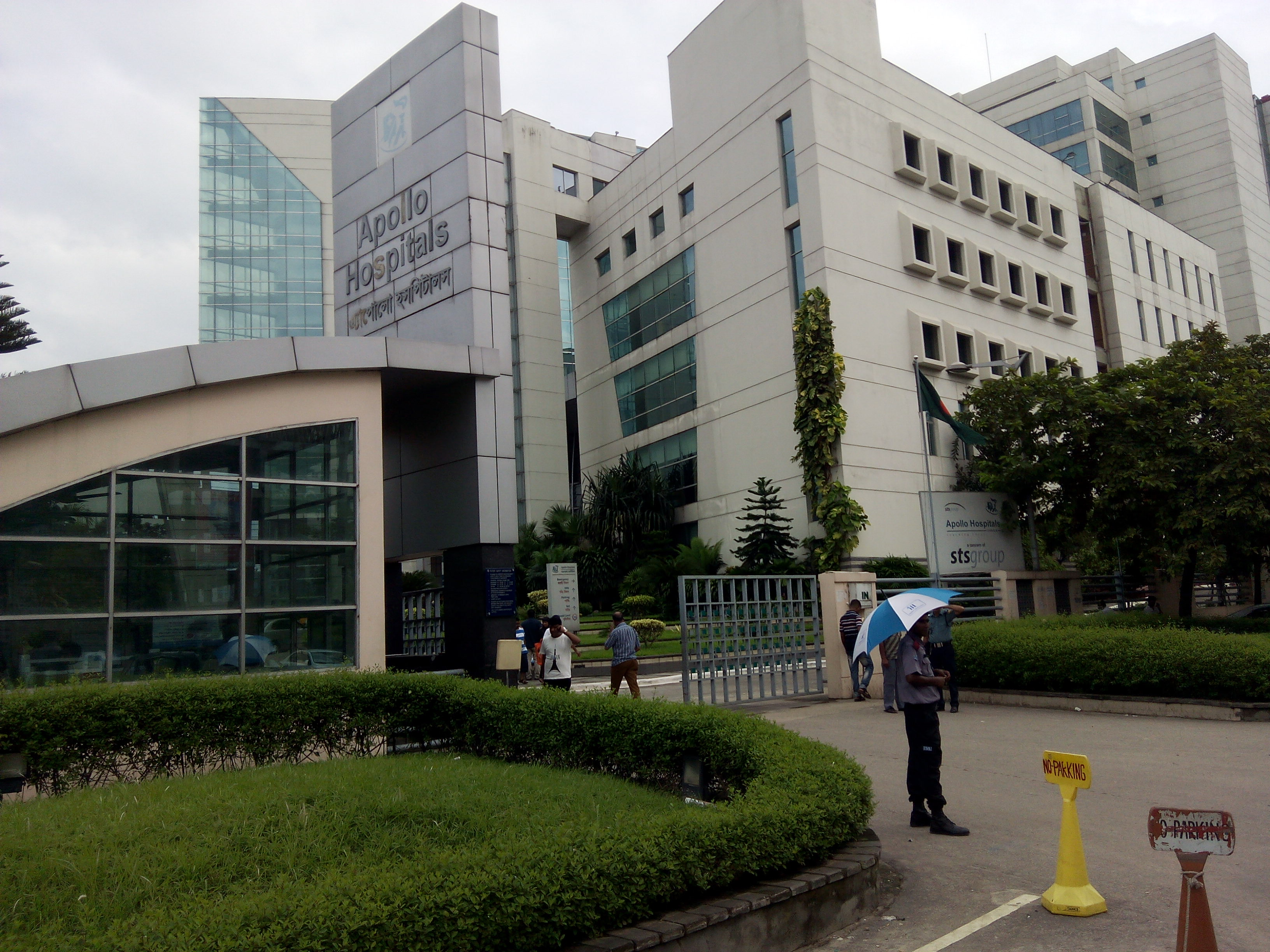
Evercare Hospital Dhaka in 2014 when it was part of Apollo Hospitals, Dhaka

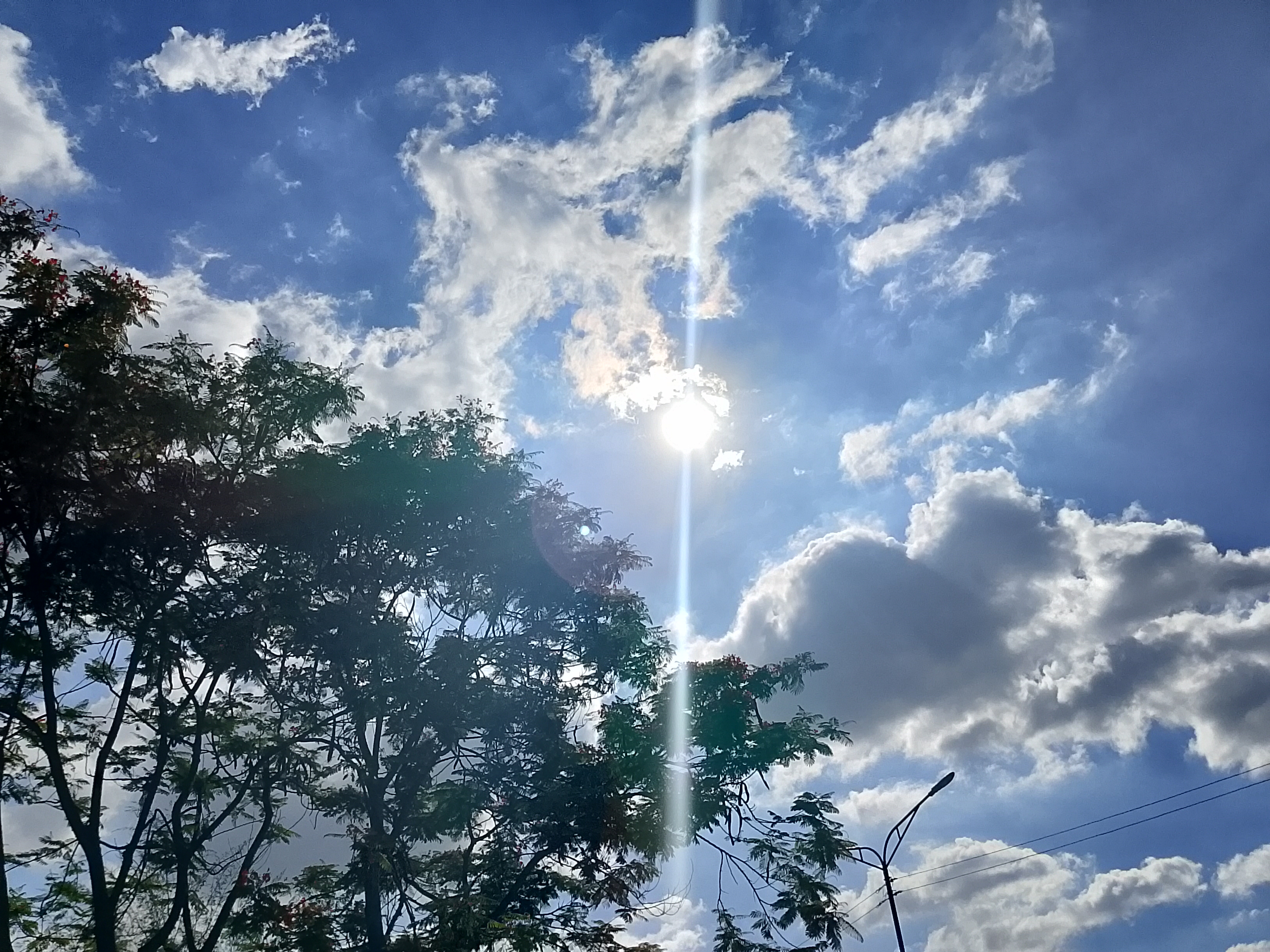
Afternoon sun glowing over Bangladesh, May 27, 2025, 3:27 PM.

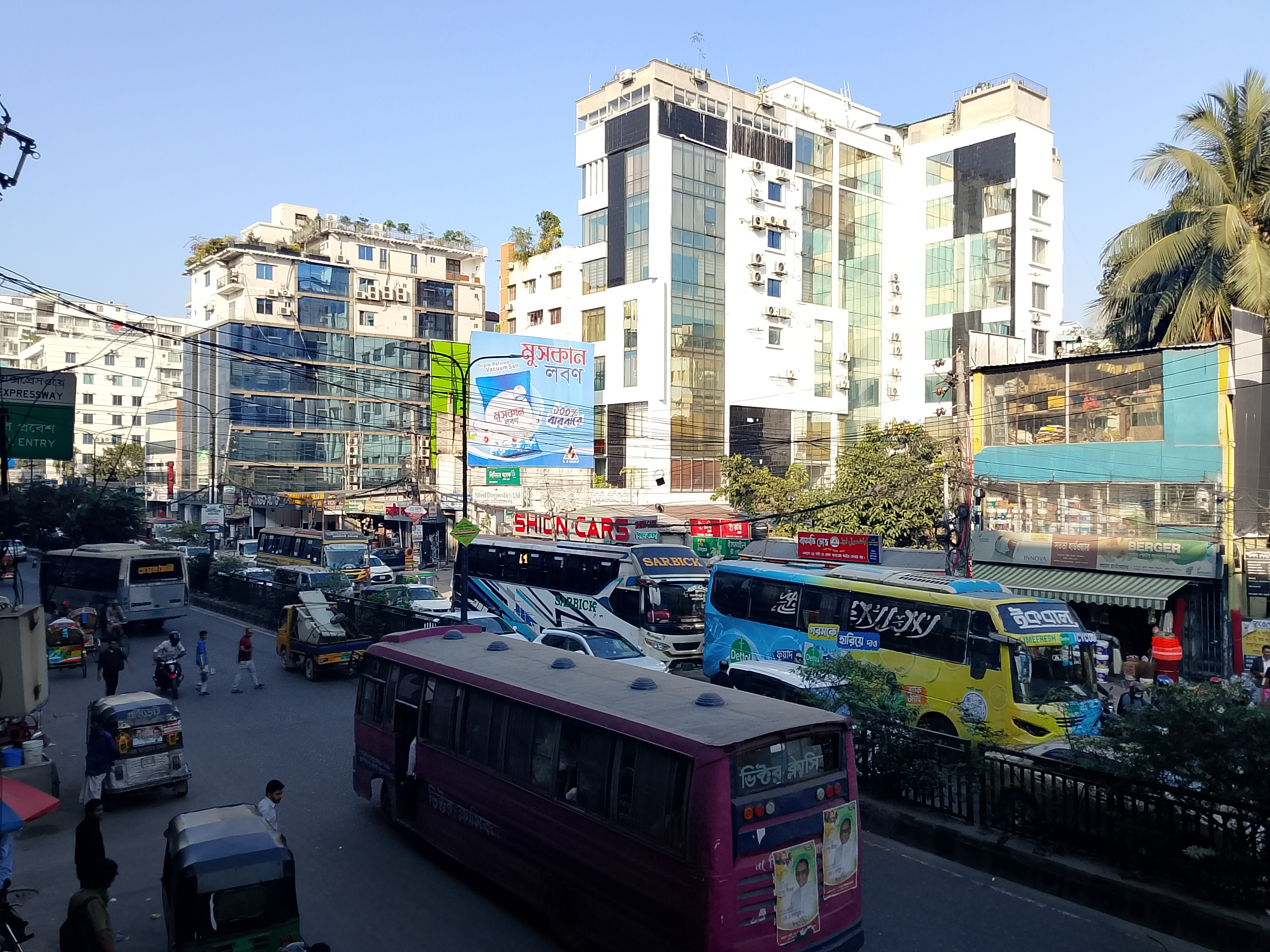
Vatara Thana

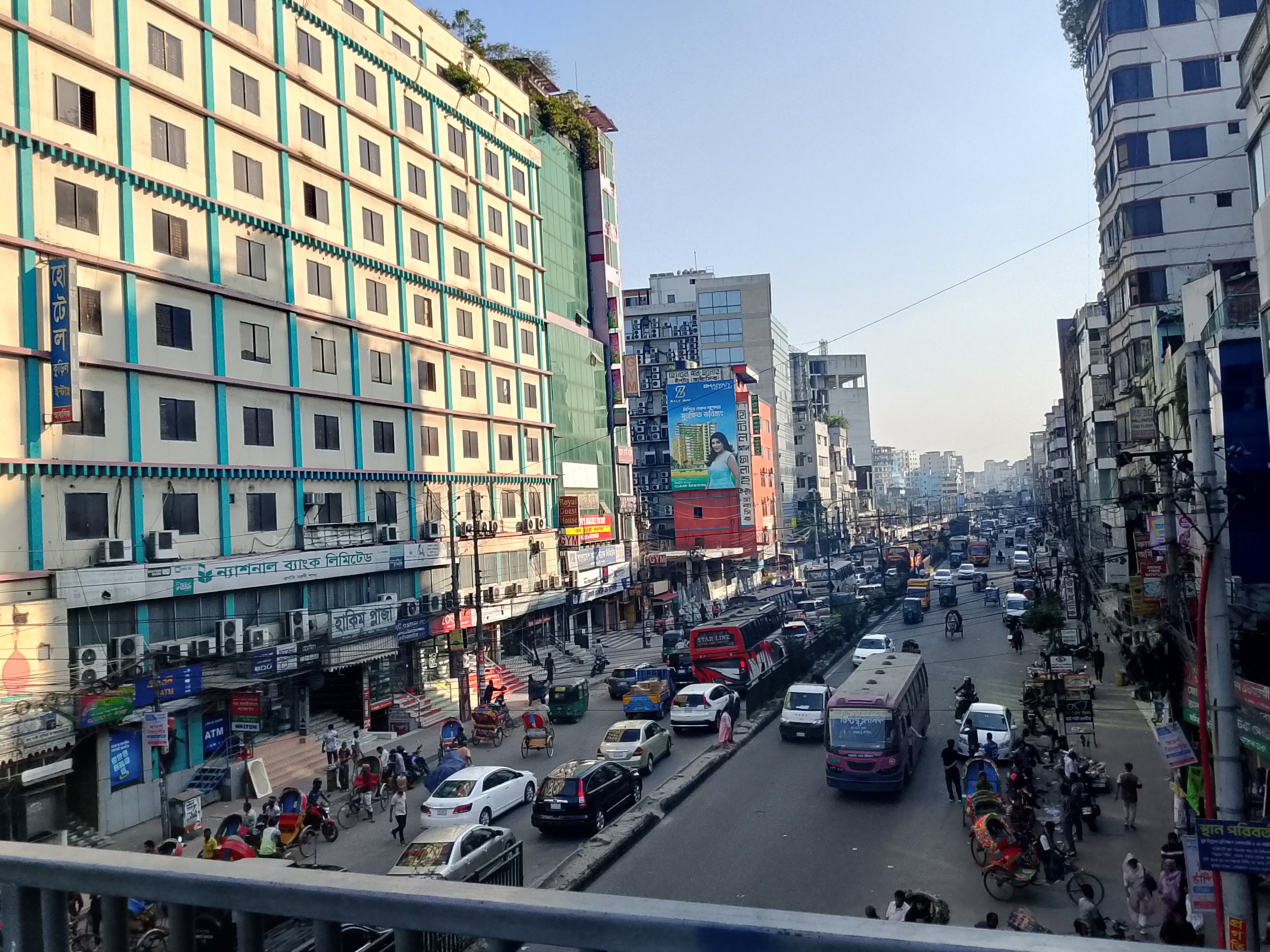
Vatara Thana

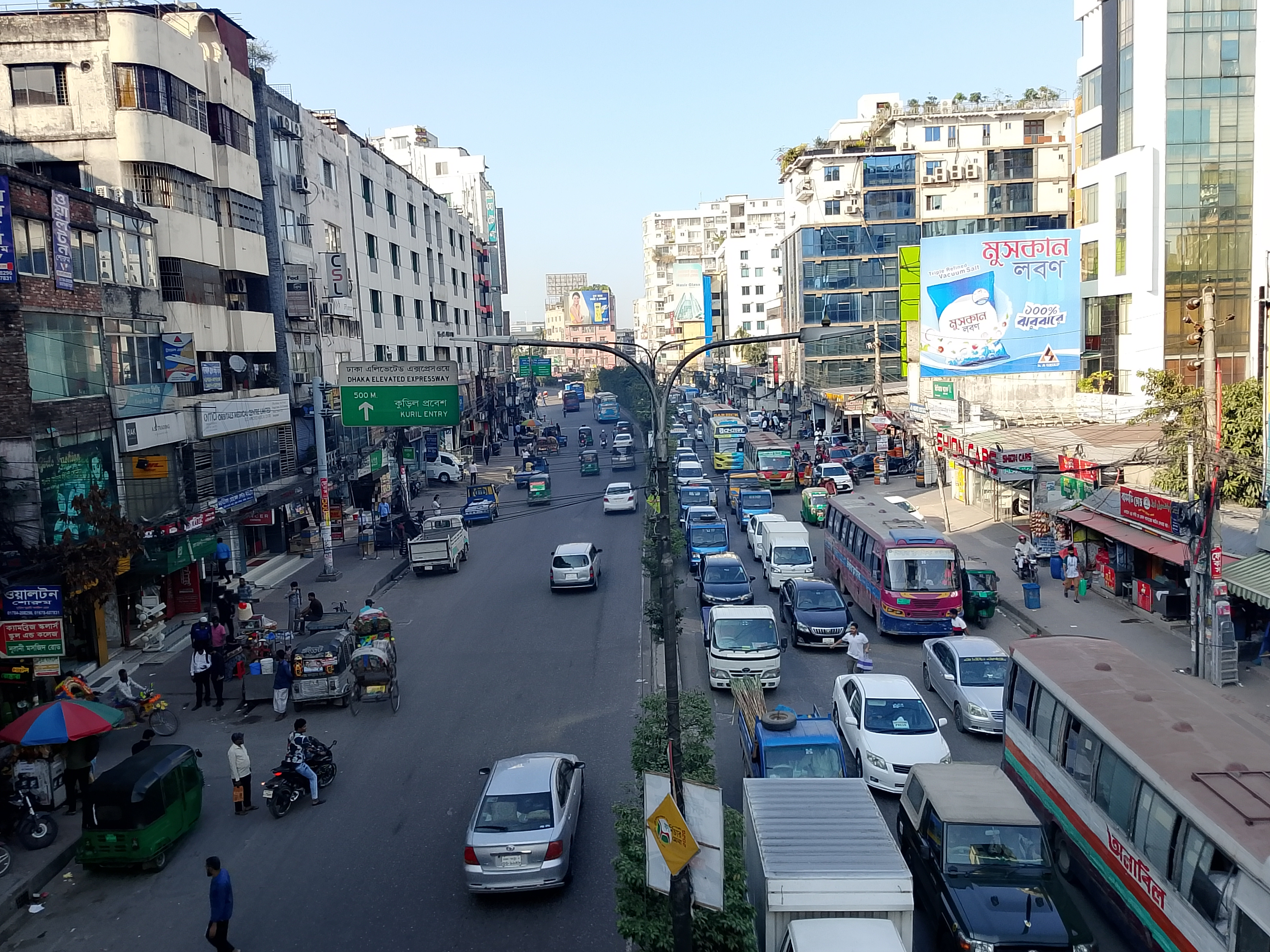
Vatara Thana

== See also ==
- Upazilas of Bangladesh
- Districts of Bangladesh
- Divisions of Bangladesh
