= ICCIT =

ICCIT may refer to:

- Institute of Communication, Culture, Information and Technology at the University of Toronto
- International Conference on Computer and Information Technology
