= UIU =

UIU may refer to:

- United International University, a private university located in Dhaka, Bangladesh
- Upper Iowa University, a private university located in Fayette, Iowa
