= Syed Akhter Hossain =

Bangladeshi computer science, professor (born 1969)

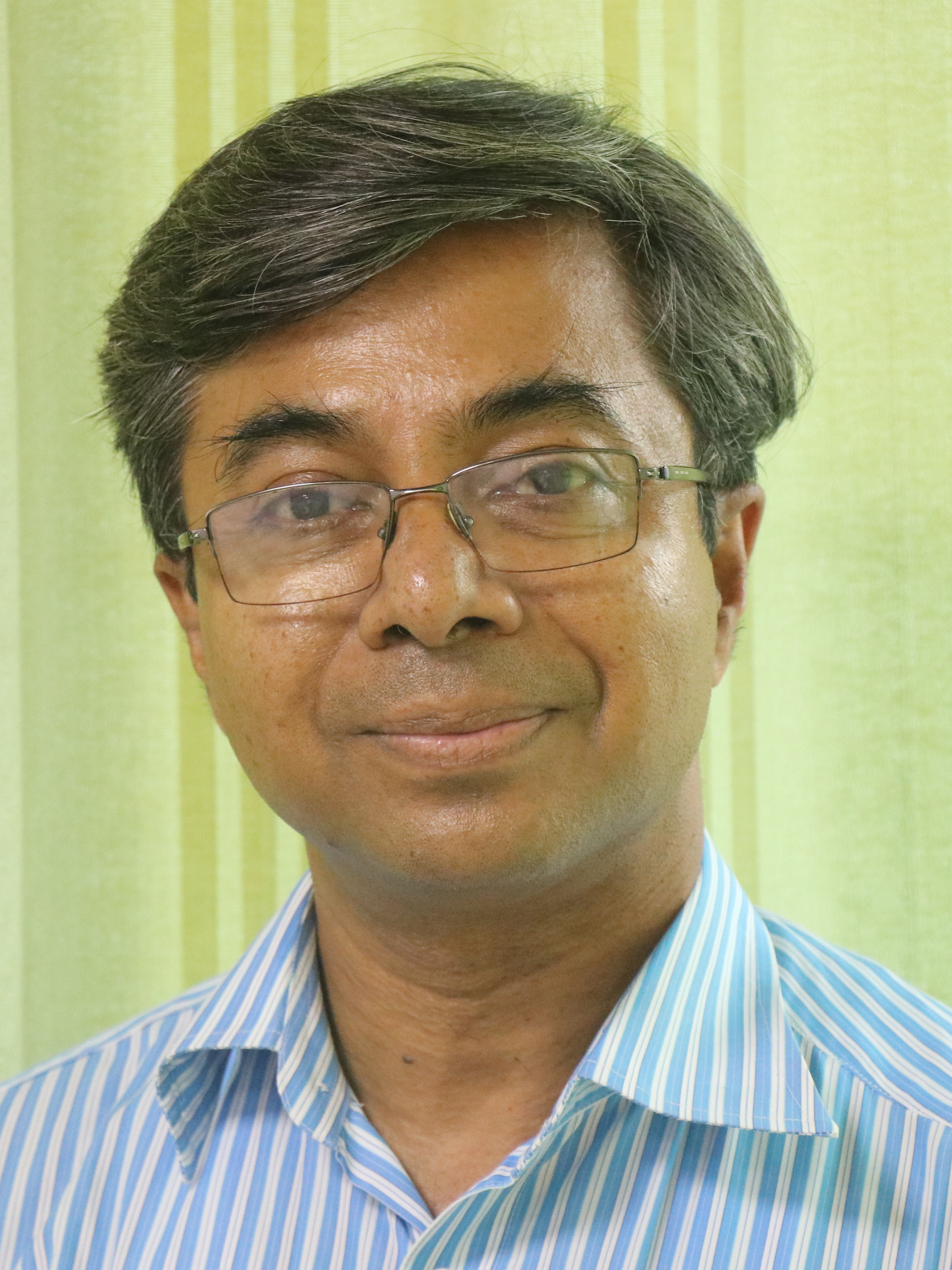
- Born: 21 January 1969 (age 57); Jessore, Bangladesh
- Scientific career
- Fields: Computer Science; Computer Engineering
- Institutions: Daffodil International University

Syed Akhter Hossain (born 1969) is a computer scientist, educator, columnist and technology consultant from Bangladesh. Currently, he is a professor and dean of Computer Science and Engineering department at Daffodil International University (DIU).

== Birth and education ==
He was born in Jessore on 21 January 1969.

== Others activities ==
Hossain is a contest director of ACM-ICPC Dhaka Regionals 2007, 2012 and Chief Judge of National Collegiate Programming Contest in Bangladesh 2015 and Contest Director of NCPC 2014. He is also the Chief Judge of ACM ICPC Dhaka Site 2015 and one of the pioneers of spreading programming education in Bangladesh by organising Computer Science Education Week and NGPC(National Girls Programming Contest).

He is also an organising committee member of ICCIT (International Conference on Computer and Information Technology) at 2013, and hold the chair on 2014.

He is also taking steps to enrich Bengali language content.

== Honors and awards ==
- Gold Medal in BSc (Honors) examination for the first place in the Faculty of Applied Sciences, Rajshahi University
- Digital Innovation Award 2011 for Bangla-2-Braille Machine Translator
- BASIS 2011 Abishaker Khoze Champion Award
- CMO-Asia Best Professor in IT Award from Singapore, July 2012
- National ICT Award 2016 for Outstanding Contribution to the ICT Education and Technology of Bangladesh at Digital World 2016 Award Night, 21 October 2016
