= Shamim Ara Nipa =

Bangladeshi dancer (born 1953)

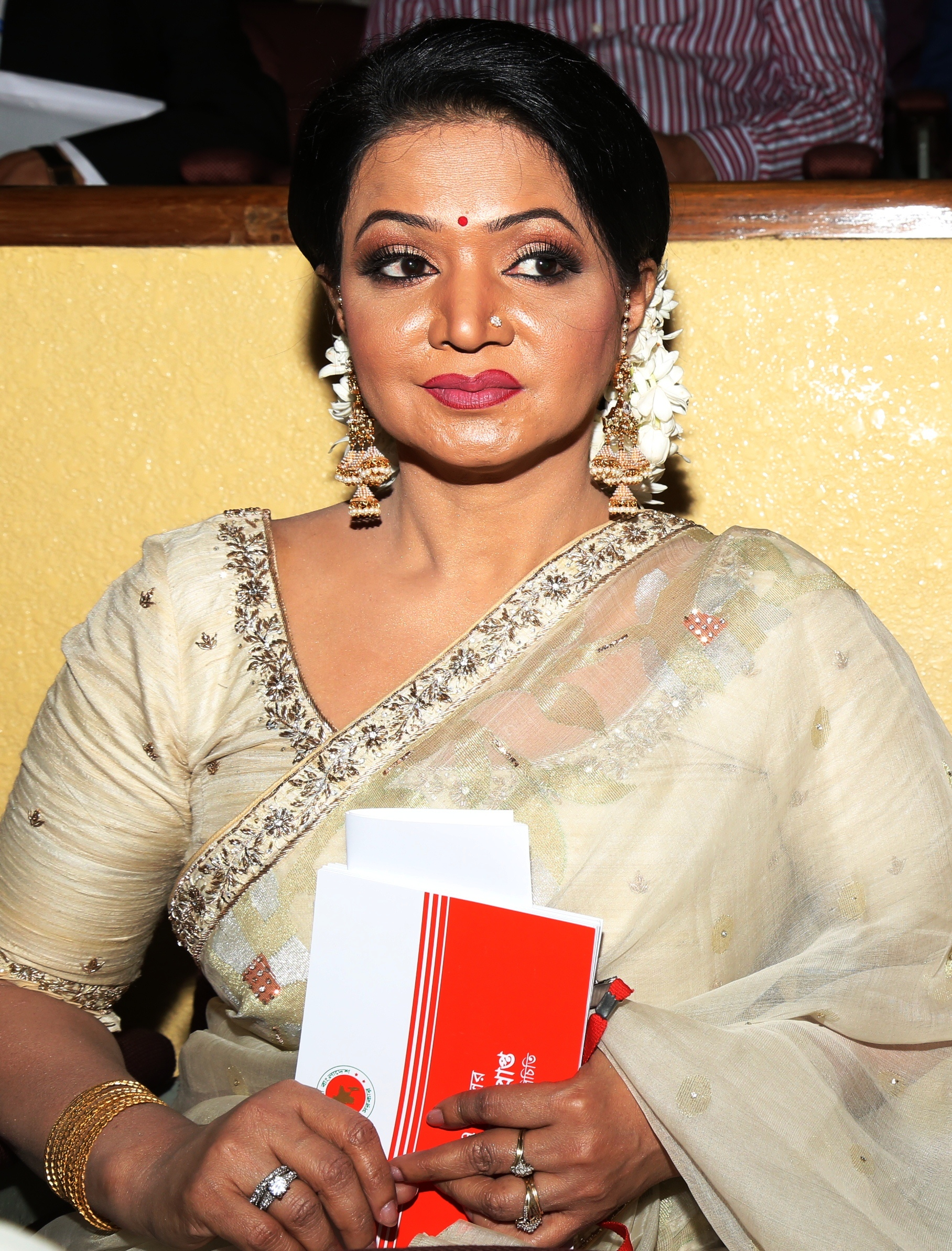
- Nipa receiving Ekushey Padak (Feb 2017)
- Occupations: Dancer, choreographer Spouse- Hasan Imam (1977—1988) divorced.
- Awards: Ekushey Padak

Shamim Ara Nipa is a Bangladeshi dancer and choreographer. She was born in Kishoreganj on 1 January 1953. She was married to dancer Hasan Imam from whom she was later divorced. She serves as a director of Nrityanchal Dance Company. She was awarded Ekushey Padak by the Government of Bangladesh in the category of choreography in 2017.

== Career ==
Nipa got her first lesson in dancing at Arts Council of Kishoreganj District. She studied under the dance instructors G A Mannan and Nikunja Bihari Pal. Later she was trained at Bulbul Academy of Fine Arts. She was trained by a North Korean dance trainer and the National Centre for the Performing Arts (China).

Since 2011, Nipa, together with Shibli Mohammad, has been compering the weekly dance magazine program, Tarana, on Bangladesh Television.

== Personal life ==
She married dancer Hasan Imam in 1973. They divorced in 1983. He died in 2020.

== Awards ==
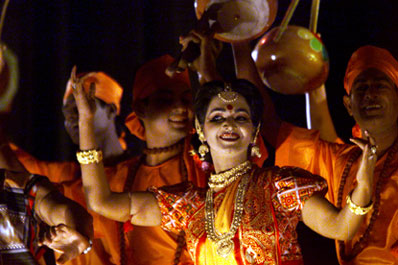

Nipa received a gold medal for the best dance artiste in Dhaka division and has been nominated best dancer by Bangladesh Folk Forum, the National Youth Council and other institutions.

- Lux Channel I Performance Award
- Prothom Alo Award
- Bachsas Award
- George Harrison Award
- Ekushey Padak (2017)
