= Daffodil International University =

Private university in Bangladesh

Coordinates: 23.8786°N 90.3214°E

- ড্যাফোডিল আন্তর্জাতিক বিশ্ববিদ্যালয়
- Crest of Daffodil International University
- Other name: DIU
- Motto: A Landmark to Create the Future
- Type: Private research university
- Established: 24 January 2002; 24 years ago
- Accreditation: AUAP, IAUP, IAU, UNAI, IIE, IAB, IEEE, ALA, APUCEN, IEB, ITET
- Affiliations: University Grants Commission (UGC)
- Chancellor: President Mirza Fakhrul Islam Alamgir
- Vice-Chancellor: M. R. Kabir
- Academic staff: 1061
- Administrative staff: 780
- Students: 21,752
- Undergraduates: 15,959
- Postgraduates: 1,146
- Location: Daffodil Smart City, Birulia, Savar, Dhaka-1216, Bangladesh
- Campus: 360 acres (150 ha); Urban
- Colors: Blue, gray and green
- Website: daffodilvarsity.edu.bd

University rankings

Global – Overall
- QS World: 1001-1200 (2027)
- THE World: 801–1000 (2026)

Global – Business and economics
- THE Business and Economics: 601-800 (2026)

Global – Liberal arts
- THE Social Sciences: 401-500 (2026)

Global – Life sciences and medicine
- THE Clinical and Health: 301-400 (2026)
- THE Life Sciences: 601-800 (2026)

Global – Science and engineering
- THE Computer Science: 601-800 (2026)
- THE Engineering: 601-800 (2026)

Regional – Overall
- QS Asia: 221 (2026)

Daffodil International University (DIU; Bengali: ড্যাফোডিল আন্তর্জাতিক বিশ্ববিদ্যালয়) is a private research university located in Daffodil Smart City, Savar, Bangladesh. It was established on 24 January 2002 under the Private University Act of 1992. DIU is the largest private university in Bangladesh by its campus size.

== History ==
Daffodil International University was established on 24 January 2002 with the approval of the University Grants Commission (UGC) and the Government of Bangladesh's Ministry of Education under the provisions of the Private University Act, 1992, which was later replaced by the Private University Act, 2010.

The university began its academic activities in 2002 with 67 students and a few academic programs in Dhaka. Over time, it expanded its faculties and infrastructure, and later established its permanent campus at Daffodil Smart City in Birulia, Savar, Dhaka District.

== Campus ==
=== Daffodil Smart City Campus ===
The campus is located in Daffodil Smart City (DSC), Birulia, Savar, Dhaka- 1216, Bangladesh. The university campus covers about 360 acres of land, making it the largest private university campus in the country by its size.

=== Ras Al Khaimah Campus ===
The university operates a branch campus in Ras Al Khaimah, United Arab Emirates.

== List of vice chancellors ==
- Aminul Islam (2002–2011)
- M. Lutfar Rahman (2011–2015)
- Yusuf Mahbubul Islam (2015–2020)
- M. Lutfar Rahman (2020–2025)
- M. R. Kabir (2025–present)

== Faculties and departments ==
The university offers bachelor's and master's degrees through 25 departments, organized into five faculties.

== Research ==
DIU publishes several peer-reviewed journals, including the DIU Journal of Science and Technology, DIU Journal of Business and Entrepreneurship, and Journal of Emerging Global Health.

== Gallery ==
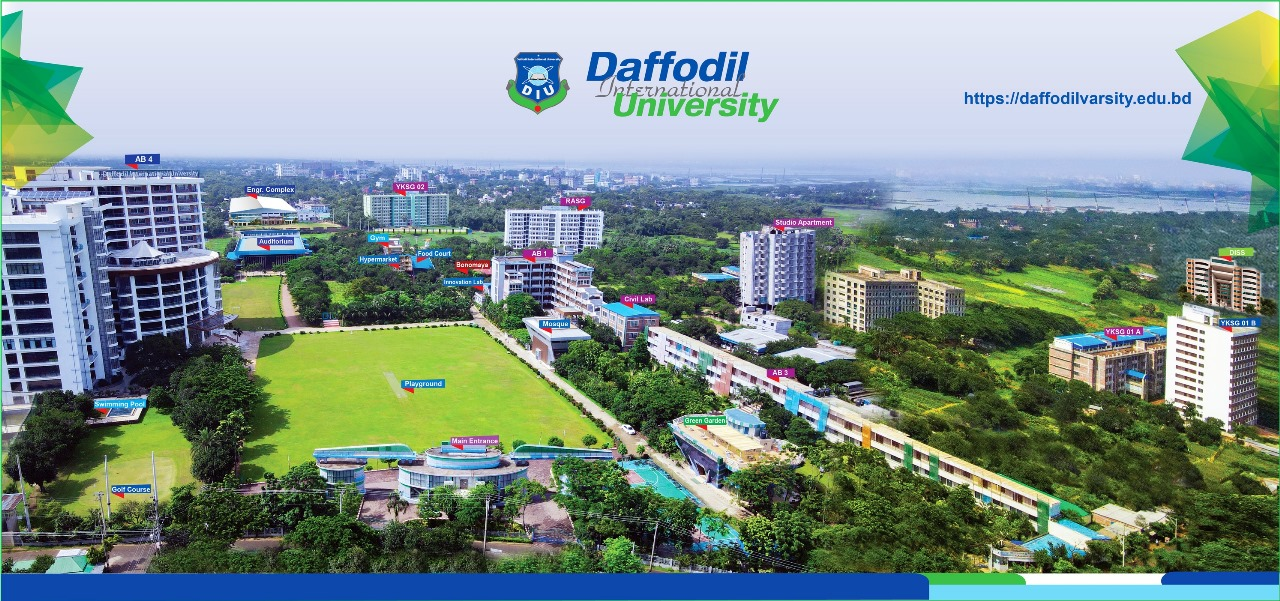
DIU Campus Map

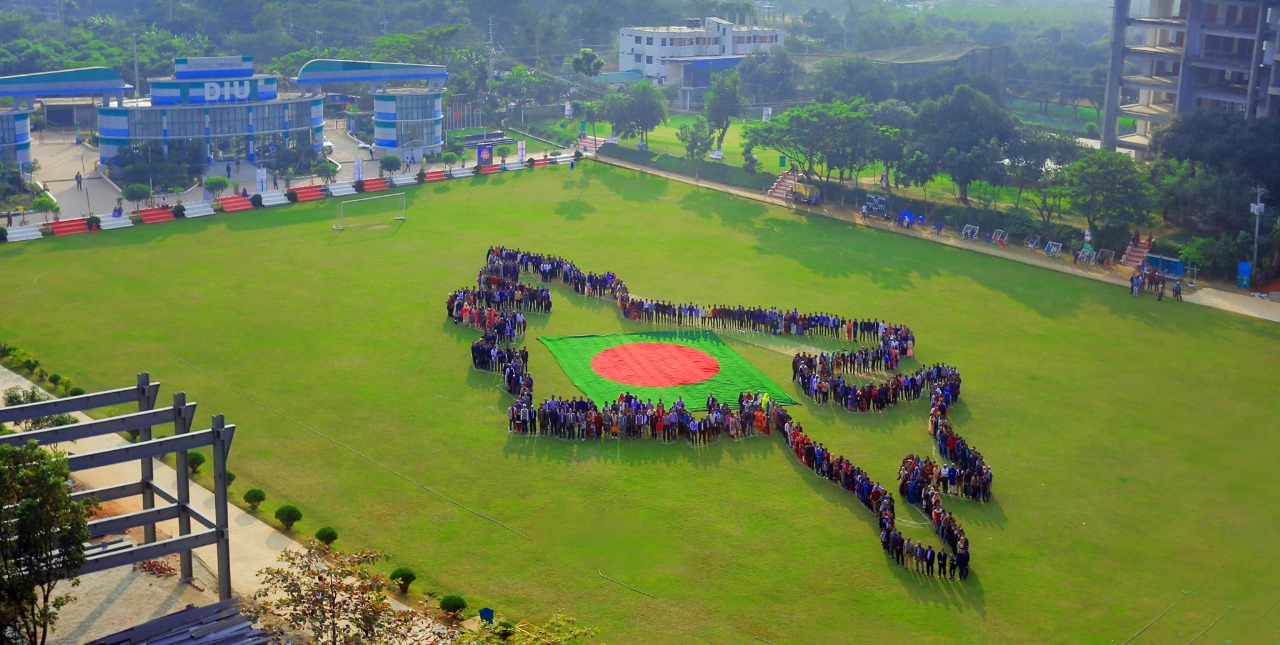
DIU Human Map

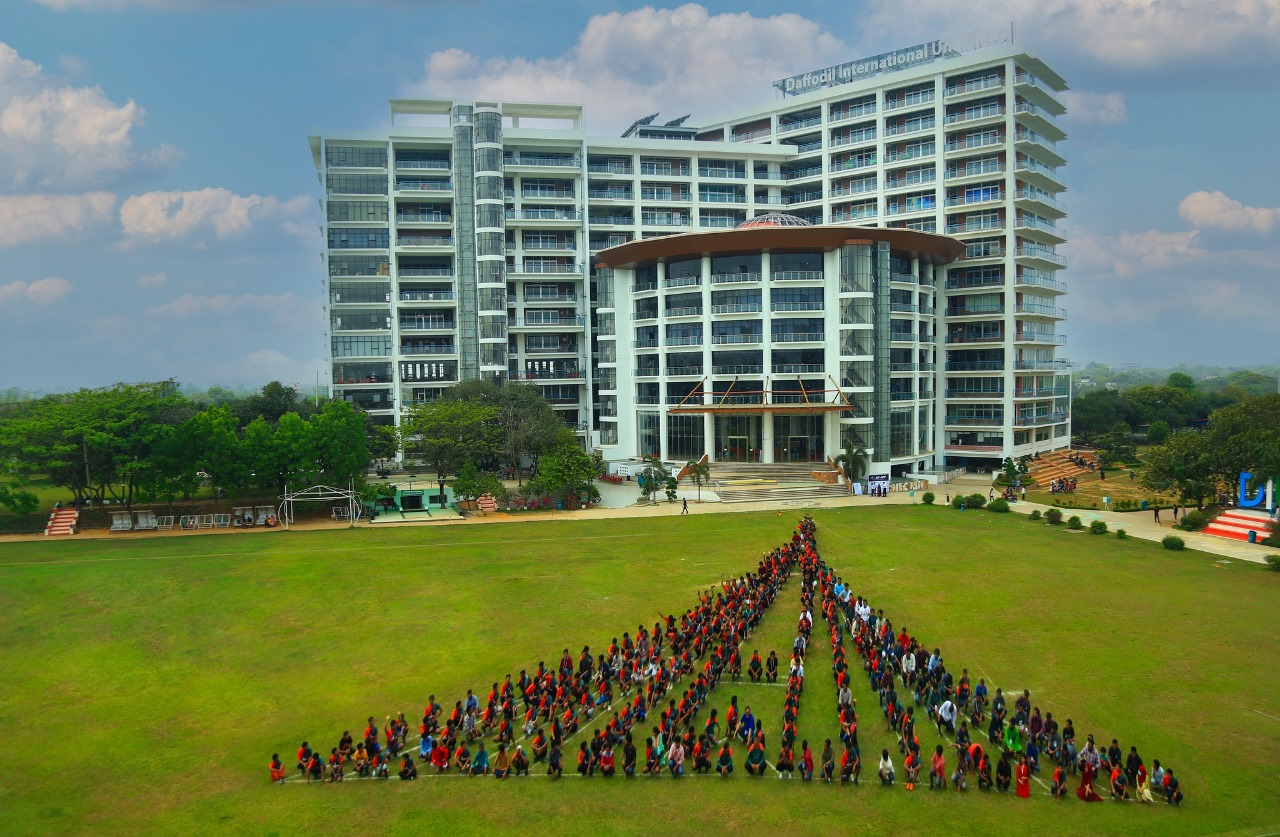
DIU Human Memorial

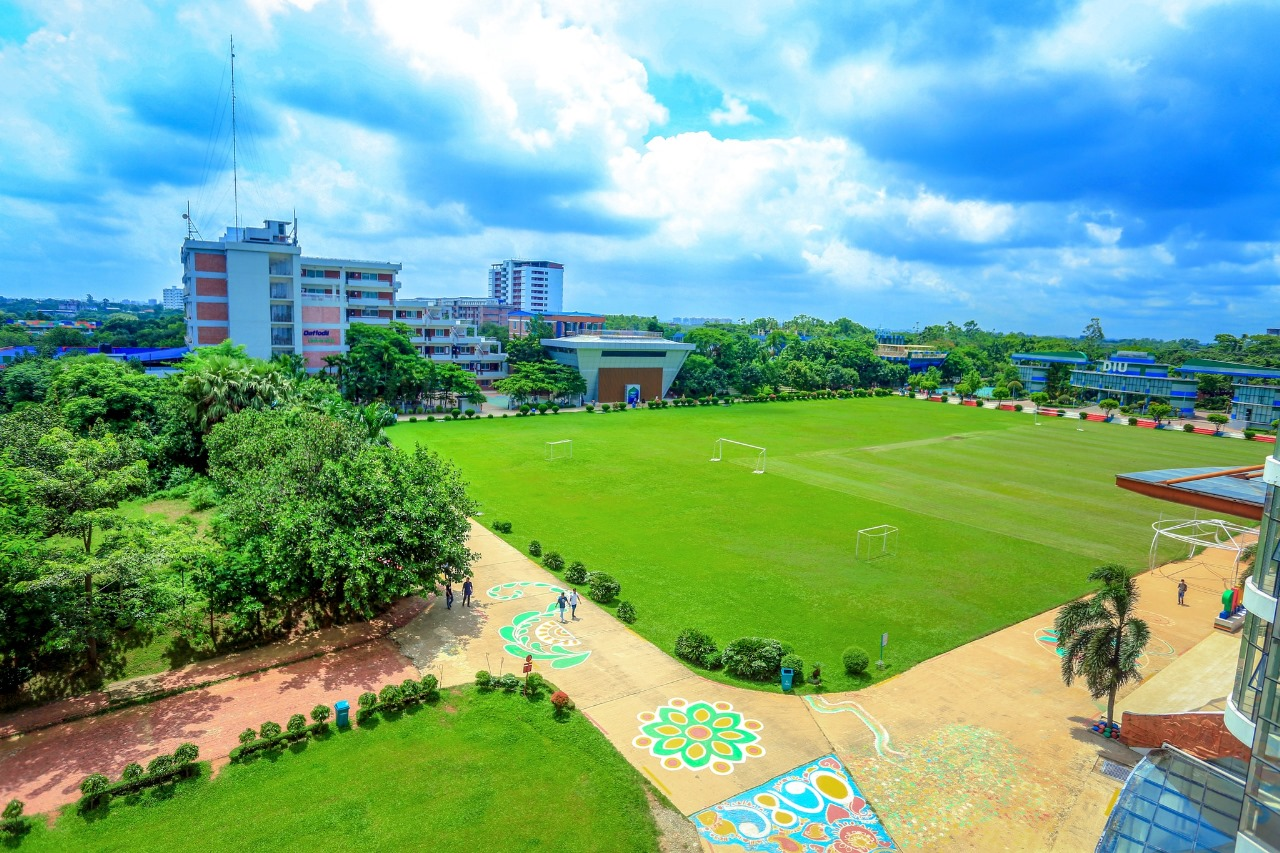
Central Field of Daffodil University

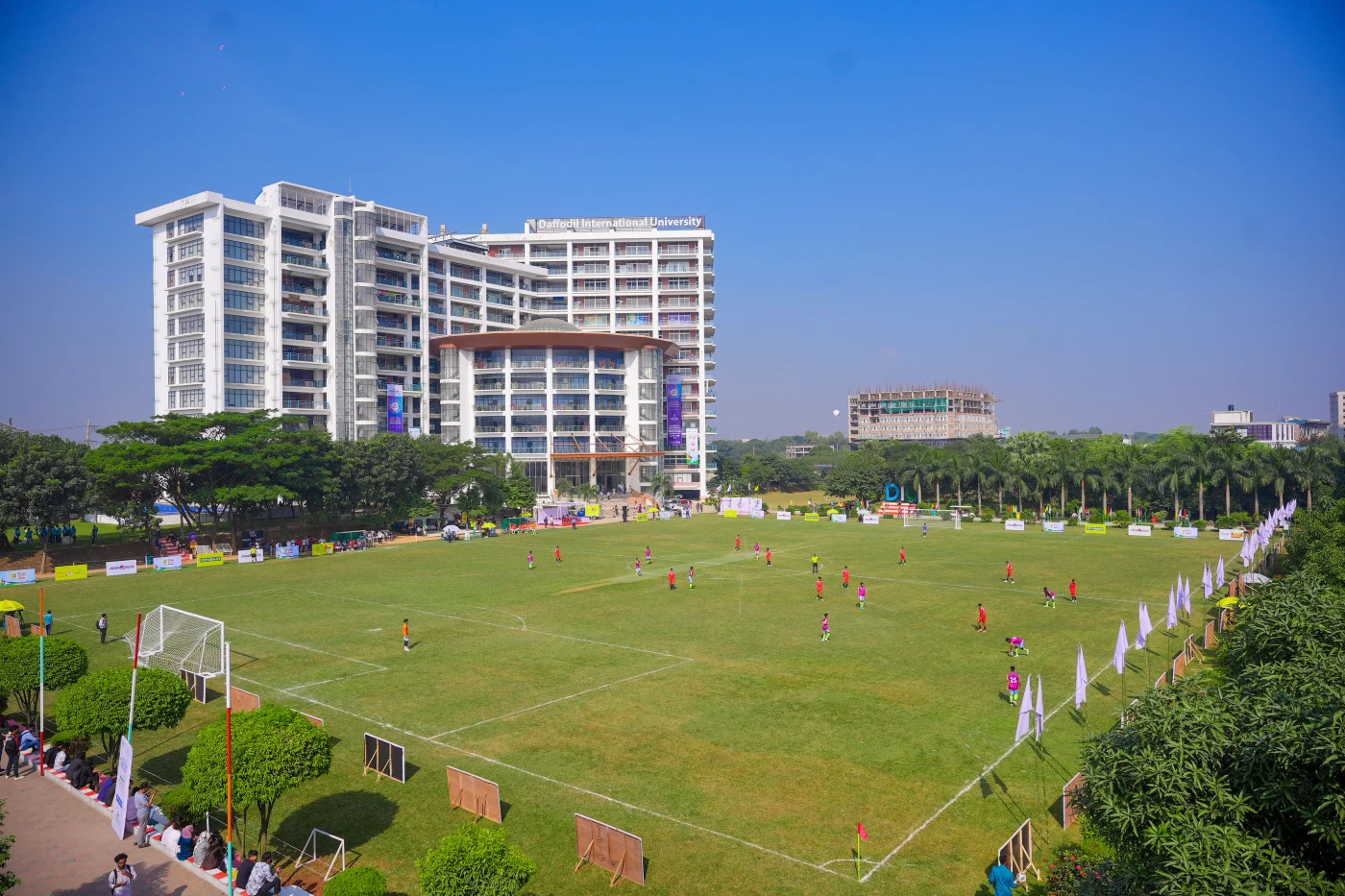
Knowledge Tower (AB4), DIU

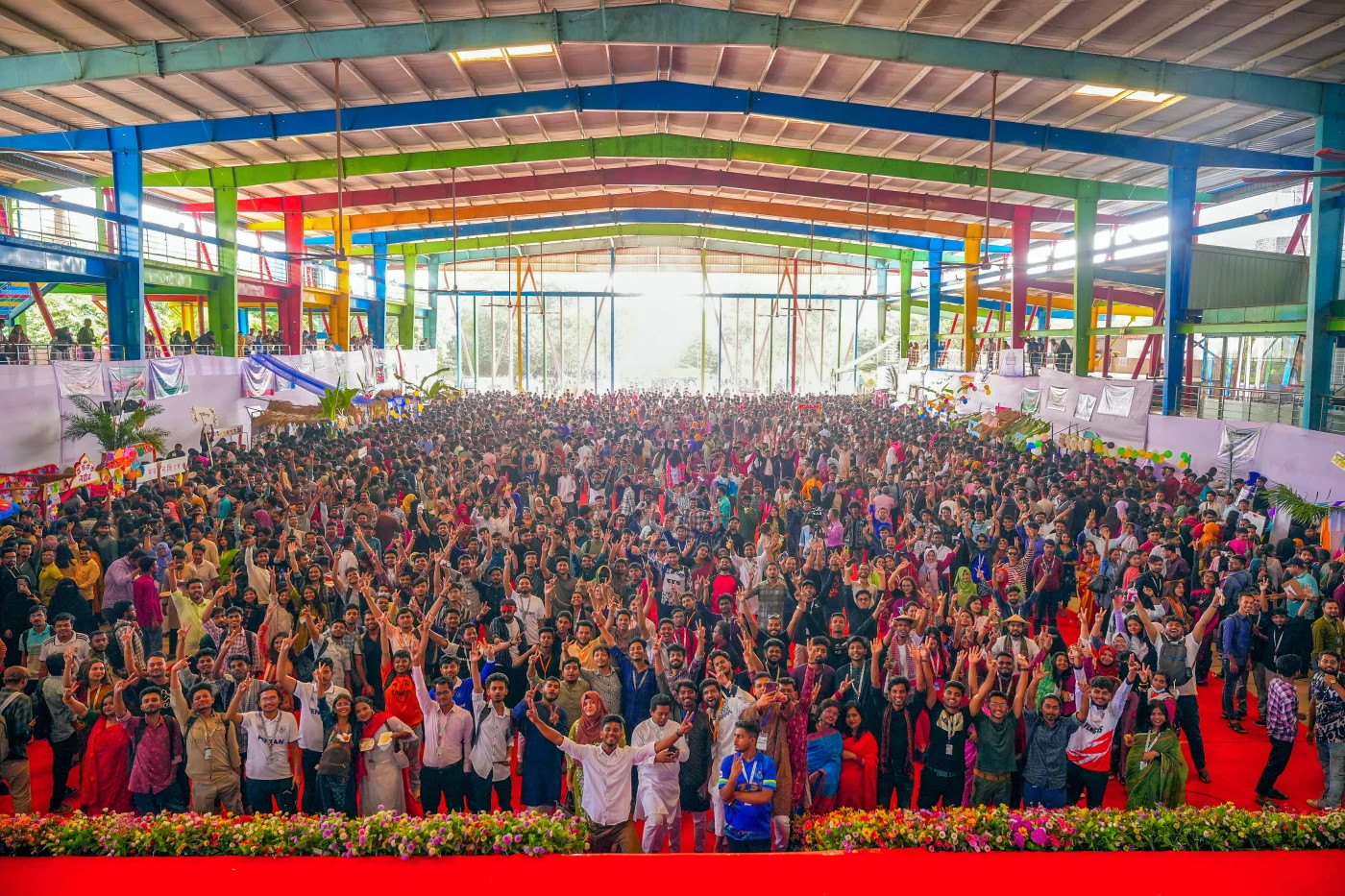
Shadhinota Shommelon Kendro, DIU

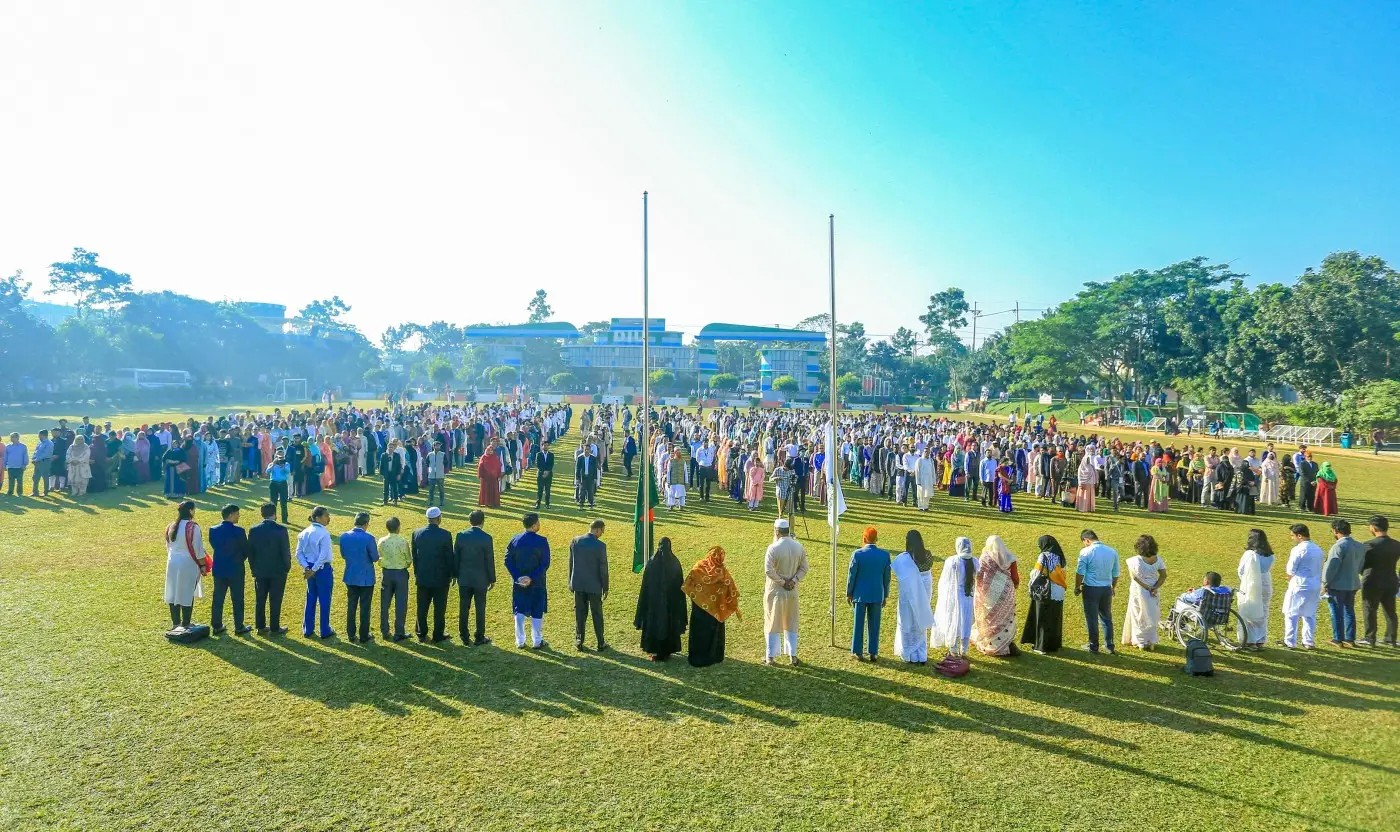
Moment at Parents Day

DIU authority conferred the D.Litt. Honoris Causa upon Achyuta Samanta.

== Rankings and awards ==
- In the QS World University Rankings: Sustainability 2026, DIU ranked 484th globally and 112th in Asia, placing it 1st among Bangladeshi universities with an overall score of 69.5.
- In the 2025 edition of the U.S. News & World Report Best Global Universities Rankings, Daffodil International University was placed at #1,022 in the world, reflecting its growing academic and research presence globally.
- According to the QS World University Rankings 2026, Daffodil International University was ranked 2nd among private universities and 4th among all universities in Bangladesh.
- DIU ranked jointly 1st in Bangladesh in THE World University Rankings 2025.
- In 2024, according to the QS World University Rankings, Daffodil International University (DIU) is ranked in 1201-1400 globally, making it the 3rd highest-ranking private university in Bangladesh, alongside East West University (EWU) and United International University (UIU).
- As per QS Asia University Rankings 2025, DIU was raned 280th.
- DIU ranked within the top 400 universities in the Times Higher Education Impact Rankings 2022.
- DIU was the top private university in Bangladesh as per Scopus Indexed Publications in 2022.
- DIU ranked 1st in Bangladesh and 191st in UI Greenmetric World University Rankings 2022.
- DIU ranked top in Bangladesh & 150th globally at UI Greenmetric World University Rankings, 2019.
- CSIC, 5th-ranked university in Bangladesh

== Notable faculty ==
- Syed Akhter Hossain, the head of the Department of Computer Science and Engineering
- Md. Abdur Rahim, professor of agriculture

== Notable alumni ==
- Sania Sultana Liza, singer
- Zhilik, singer
- Isa Faysal, footballer
