= Solmaid =

Coordinates: 23.8050°N 90.4313°E

Solmaid is a neighborhood of Dhaka under Vatara Thana.

== History ==
Solmaid had a traditional industry of making hand fans but the industry has declined in the 21st century. In 2018, Bangladesh Ansar started to build the headquarters of an armed wing, Ansar Striking Force Headquarter, in Solmaid but faced resistance from the locals who alleged the land belonged to them. Bangladesh Ansar claimed they bought the land from the Basumati Housing Project of Hirajheel Property Development Private Limited.

== Education ==
- Solmaid High School
- Solmaid School & College
- Makeshift Computer Training Center- Near Chapra Mosjid, Solmaid, Dhaka 1212 https://g.co/kgs/Pe2fkDY
