= M. R. Kabir =

Bangladeshi academic

- এম. আর. কবির

Vice Chancellor of Daffodil International University
- Incumbent
- Assumed office 10 July 2025
- Chancellor: President of Bangladesh
- Preceded by: M. Lutfar Rahman

Personal details
- Education: B.Sc, M.Sc, PhD, PG Diploma
- Alma mater: University of Roorkee (now Indian Institute of Technology Roorkee) BUET Anna University KU Leuven

M. R. Kabir is a Bangladeshi academic, researcher, and civil engineering scholar. In July 2025, he was appointed as the Vice-Chancellor of Daffodil International University (DIU). He previously served as Pro Vice-Chancellor of the University of Asia Pacific (UAP) for four consecutive terms and held key academic roles in national and international institutions.

== Education ==
Kabir completed his Bachelor of Science in Civil Engineering from the University of Roorkee (now Indian Institute of Technology Roorkee) in 1980. He earned his M.Sc. in Water Resources Engineering from BUET in 1984 and completed a Post-Graduate Diploma in Hydrology and Water Resources Engineering from Anna University in 1985 under a UNESCO Fellowship. In 1993, he earned his Ph.D. in Civil Engineering from the Catholic University of Leuven (KU Leuven), Belgium.

== Career ==
Kabir began his professional career as an engineer at EAH Consultants and later at the Public Works Department of Bangladesh (1980–1986). He transitioned to academia in 1987, joining BUET as an assistant professor in the Department of Water Resources Engineering, where he eventually became associate professor.

In 2001, Kabir joined the University of Asia Pacific (UAP) as a professor in the Department of Civil Engineering. He served in several senior positions at UAP, including Dean of the School of Engineering, Head of the Civil Engineering Department, Acting Registrar, and Acting Vice-Chancellor. He was appointed Pro Vice-Chancellor in 2003 and served until 2019 across four consecutive terms.

Internationally, Kabir worked as a visiting scholar and researcher at institutions such as the University of Alberta, University of Texas at Austin, and TU Delft. He also served as guest faculty at multiple private universities in Bangladesh.

He joined Daffodil International University in 2021 as a professor in the Department of Civil Engineering and was appointed Vice-Chancellor on 10 July 2025.

== Research and publications ==
Kabir's main research interests include hydrology, river engineering, flood control, and sediment transport. He has published 49 research papers in national and international journals and conferences, including in publications by the American Society of Civil Engineers (ASCE), Natural Hazards, Urban Water, and the Institution of Engineers Bangladesh (IEB).

He has supervised numerous postgraduate and doctoral theses at BUET and UAP and served on editorial boards of several academic journals.

== Leadership ==
Kabir has served in various academic and professional leadership roles:

- Chairman, Bangladesh Chapter of the Association of Universities of Asia and the Pacific (AUAP) – 2015 to 2021
- Member, Board of Accreditation for Engineering and Technical Education (BAETE), IEB
- Member, Board of Governors, Institute of Water and Flood Management (IWFM), BUET (2014–2016)
- President, Bangladesh Society for Total Quality Management (BSTQM)
- Director General, Bangladesh Chapter of the World Council for Total Quality and Excellence in Education (WCTQEE)

== Awards ==
In recognition of his contributions, he received:

- Quality Leadership Award – WCTQEE, 2011
- Inspirational Leadership Award – EDS Business School, Penang, Malaysia, 2012
