= Yusuf Mahbubul Islam =

Bangladeshi educationist and academic

- ইউসুফ মাহবুবুল ইসলাম

Vice-Chancellor of Southeast University
- Incumbent
- Assumed office 19 May 2024
- Preceded by: AFM Mafizul Islam

Vice-Chancellor of Daffodil International University
- In office 2015–2020
- Preceded by: M. Lutfar Rahman
- Succeeded by: M. Lutfar Rahman

Personal details
- Education: Ph.D (Manufacturing & Engineering Management), Strathclyde University

Yusuf Mahbubul Islam is a Bangladeshi academic. He is the vice-chancellor of Southeast University. He is the former vice-chancellor of Daffodil International University (DIU) and the founding vice-chancellor of Metropolitan University, Sylhet (MU). He was formerly the dean of the School of Engineering, Technology and Sciences (SETS) at Independent University, Bangladesh (IUB) and a professor of computer science and engineering at Open University Malaysia (OPM) and BRAC University.

== Career ==
From September 1995 to December 2002, Islam served as managing director of Soft-Ed Ltd, where he was involved in software development.

Islam joined Daffodil International University (DIU) in 2010 as a professor of Computer Science and Engineering and later became the executive director of the Human Resources Development Institute (HRDI). From July 2015 to April 2020, he served as the vice-chancellor of DIU. He remained at the university as a professor until February 2024.

Since June 2020, Islam has chaired the Institute for the Development of Online Learning (IDOL). At Independent University, Bangladesh (IUB), Islam was the Dean of the School of Engineering Technology and Sciences from September 2020 to October 2022. He then served as a Professor from October 2022 to February 2024 and as Director of Graduate Studies, Research, and Industry Relations from January 2023 to February 2024.

In May 2024, Islam was appointed vice-chancellor of Southeast University, Dhaka.
