= Md. Abul Kashem Mia =

Bangladeshi academic

Professor Dr. Md. Abul Kashem Mia
- Education: BUET Tohoku University
- Occupations: Academic, Computer Scientist
- Employer: United International University
- Known for: Vice Chancellor of United International University
- Title: Vice Chancellor of United International University

Md. Abul Kashem Mia is a Bangladeshi academic and computer scientist currently serving as the Vice Chancellor of United International University.

== Early life and education ==
Prof. Kashem earned his Bachelor of Science in Electrical and Electronic Engineering and Master's in Computer Science and Engineering from Bangladesh University of Engineering and Technology in 1989 and 1992, respectively. He obtained an MS (1995) and a PhD (1998) in System Information Sciences from Tohoku University.

== Career ==
Mia began his academic career as a faculty member in the Department of Computer Science and Engineering at Bangladesh University of Engineering and Technology. He served as the Head of the CSE Department from 2001 to 2003 and was appointed Controller of Examinations from 2012 to 2018. Mia played a pioneering role in the digital transformation of the Bangladesh University of Engineering and Technology, notably leading the development of the BUET Institutional Information System in 2006.

Mia later joined United International University, serving as the Dean of the School of Science & Engineering from 2018 to 2019. He was appointed Pro-Vice Chancellor of United International University in April 2021 before being named Vice Chancellor in October 2023 for a four-year term.

On 26 April 2025, United International University Vice Chancellor Mia and 11 departmental heads resigned amid ongoing student protests at the university’s Bhatara Madani Avenue campus. The demonstrations were sparked by grievances over exam policies, including reduced test durations, unchanged improvement fees, and handling a student’s request for a make-up exam following a family bereavement. The Board of Trustees of United International University formed an independent fact-finding committee to investigate the incidents. Chaired by Professor Md Mujibur Rahman, the committee is expected to submit a report within seven working days, based on a thorough and impartial review of evidence and testimonies.
