= M. A. Rahim =

Bangladeshi horticultural scientist and academic

Md. Abdur Rahim
- Born: 22 July 1956 (age 70)
- Education: Bangladesh Agricultural University
- Known for: Fruit tree improvement, agrobiodiversity research, horticultural development in Bangladesh
- Awards: Independence Award, 2026
- Scientific career
- Fields: Horticulture, Agricultural Science, Agroforestry, Plant Genetic Resources
- Workplaces: Daffodil International University; Bangladesh Agricultural University

M. Abdur Rahim (born 22 July 1956), published as M. A. Rahim, is a Bangladeshi horticultural scientist, agricultural researcher, and academic. In 2026, he awarded the highest civilian honour award, Independence Award, in recognition of his contribution to Research and training.

== Early life and education ==
Rahim completed his higher education in agriculture and horticulture in Bangladesh and the United Kingdom. He earned a Bachelor of Science (BSc) in Agriculture from Bangladesh Agricultural University in 1980, and later obtained a Doctor of Philosophy (PhD) in Horticulture from the University of London in 1988.

== Academic career ==
Abdur Rahim has served as the Director of the BAU Germplasm Centre since 1991. He currently serves as a Professor and Head of the Department of Agricultural Science at Daffodil International University (DIU). He is known for his contributions to fruit tree improvement, conservation of plant genetic resources, agrobiodiversity, and sustainable horticultural practices in Bangladesh.

Rahim previously served as a long-time faculty member at Bangladesh Agricultural University, where he played a role in establishing the BAU Germplasm Centre and advancing national fruit research programs.

=== Research and contributions ===
- Directing one of Bangladesh's largest fruit germplasm collections at BAU.
- Leading the development and field adaptation of the “BAU Kul-1” fruit variety (1999–2003).
- Conducting long-term research on mango, jackfruit, garlic, onion and carrot improvement with national and international partners.
- Leading nationwide studies on agrobiodiversity, dietary diversity and food safety in coastal and hill regions.

== Awards and honours ==
- BAS Gold Medal, Bangladesh Academy of Sciences – 2012
- Independence Award, 2026
