= Qumrul Ahsan =

Bangladeshi academic

Qumrul Ahsan is a Bangladeshi academic and vice-chancellor of the University of Asia Pacific. He is a former professor of the Universiti Teknikal Malaysia Melaka.

== Early life ==
Ahsan completed his bachelor's and master's in Metallurgical Engineering at the Bangladesh University of Engineering and Technology. He did his PhD in Metallurgy and Materials at the University of Birmingham.

== Career ==
From April 1998 to June 1991, Ahsan was an engineer of the Bangladesh Atomic Energy Commission. He joined Bangladesh University of Engineering and Technology after leaving the commission. He edited Engineering and Technological Education for the 21st Century, Proceedings of the National Symposium on Engineering and Technological Education, in 2007 with Md. Mazharul Hoque and Tahmeed M. Al-Hussaini.

Ahsan had taught at the Ahsanullah University of Science and Technology, Universiti Teknikal Malaysia Melaka, and the Bangladesh University of Engineering and Technology. He contributed to Natural Polymers, Biopolymers, Biomaterials, and Their Composites, Blends, and IPNs published in 2012 by Apple Academic Press. Ahsan contributed to Sustainable Energy and Development, Advanced Materials book published in 2014.

Ahsan was appointed the vice-chancellor of the University of Asia Pacific in February 2022. Under him, the University of Asia Pacific was able to get its permanent certificate from the Ministry of Education in June 2022. In October 2023, he spoke at seminar on smart grid organized by the Dhaka Power Distribution Company Limited.
