= Mohammad Ataul Karim =

Bangladeshi-American scientist

- Born: 4 May 1953 (age 73); Barlekha Upazila, Sylhet, East Bengal, Pakistan
- Citizenship: Bangladesh/ US
- Education: Faujdarhat Cadet College; MC College; University of Dhaka; University of Alabama
- Known for: Biophysics; Non Linear Image Processing; Optical computing Electro-optical displays Optical & Hybrid Electro-optical Systems Design
- Scientific career
- Fields: Optical computing Electrical engineering
- Workplaces: University of Arkansas at Little Rock; Wichita State University; University of Dayton; University of Tennessee at Knoxville; City College of New York; Old Dominion University

Mohammad Ataul Karim (Bengali: মোহাম্মদ আতাউল করিম; born 4 May 1953) is a Bangladeshi American scientist and higher education administrator, with expertise in electro-optical systems, optical computing, and pattern recognition. Ataul Karim is ranked amongst the top 50 researchers who contributed most to journal Applied Optics in its 50-year history. Ataul Karim served as provost, executive vice chancellor and chief operating officer of the University of Massachusetts Dartmouth between June 2013 – 2020, and was for 9 years the first vice president for research of Old Dominion University (ODU) in Norfolk, Virginia.

== Biography ==
Mohammad Ataul Karim was born in Barlekha, a border town in South Sylhet. He attended Shatma Primary for his elementary education and Patharia Chotolekha High for a year after which he left home to be schooled at Faujdarhat Cadet College (1965–1969), Sylhet MC College (1969–1972), and the University of Dacca (1972–1976) wherefrom he received his bachelor's honors degree in physics. Ataul Karim earned his master's degrees in physics (1978) and electrical engineering (1979), and a doctor of philosophy degree in electrical engineering (1982) from the University of Alabama.

Ataul Karim practiced creative writing in high school. Many of his popular science writings in Bengali appeared in Biggyan Shamoeeki and Bangla Academy Biggyan Patrika during 1972–1976. Of these, the most significant were Biborthon Kahinee, a series of articles on cosmic and biological evolution, and Shamproteek, a monthly feature on current affairs in science, both of which appeared in Biggyan Shamoeeki. By the second year of his bachelor's degree in 1974, he had completed his first book manuscript, which he submitted to Bangla Academy for publication. After about two years, the academy informed him that it was not prepared to take a chance on its juvenile author. This episode troubled him deeply, ending his creative writing efforts in Bengali. All his subsequent books and articles were written in English, and all were published from outside of Bangladesh.

A 2004 government of Bangladesh report and a number of books in Bengali, including Bangladesher Shera Bigyani (Hitler A. Halim, Shikor, 2004), Medhabi Manusher Golpo (Mohammad Kaykobad, Annyaprokash, 2005), "Medhabi O Binoyi Manusher Golpo" (Mohammad Kaykobad, "Shore O", 2020), and "Tarae Tarae Khochito" (Fardin Munir and Munir Hasan, "Odomya Prokash", 2022) as well as Star Insight, cite him as an example of the outstanding success of the Bangladeshi diaspora. His efforts to correct illegal practices that otherwise discriminated against international graduate students were featured by the Chronicle of Higher Education, The Wall Street Journal in "Hidden Costs of a Brain Gain" and in turn by David Heenan in his book "Flight Capital: The Alarming Exodus of America's Best And Brightest".

== Professional affiliations ==
Prior to University of Massachusetts Dartmouth (2013–present), he had held academic appointments with the University of Arkansas at Little Rock (1982–1983), Wichita State University (1983–1986), University of Dayton (1986-1998: founding director, Electro-Optics Program, 1990–1998; chair of electrical and computer engineering, 1994–1998), University of Tennessee at Knoxville (1998–2000: head of the Department of Electrical and Computer Engineering), City College of New York of the City University of New York (2000–2004: dean of engineering), and Old Dominion University (2004-2013: vice president for research). Ataul Karim is an elected fellow of seven societies: Optical Society of America (1993), Society of Photo-Optical Instrumentation Engineers (1995), Bangladesh Academy of Sciences (2002), Institute of Physics (2006), Institution of Engineering & Technology (2006), Institute of Electrical and Electronics Engineers (2009), and Asia-Pacific Artificial Intelligence Association (2022).

== Scholarly research ==
He supervised MS/PhD research of over 60 graduate students and authored 19 books, 13 book chapters, and over 365 research papers. He guest-edited 36 journal special issues in areas of communication, computing, multimedia, networks, optics, pattern recognition, infrared systems, remote sensing, and software.

== Relevance to Bangladesh ==
He leads the International Conference on Computer and Information Technology, now in its 25th year. Since 2009, with assistance of 5 teams of guest editors, Ataul Karim produced 20 journal special issues that featured works of Bangladesh-based researchers in the fields of communications, computing, multimedia, networks, and software. His edited book on "Technical Challenges and Design Issues in Bangla Language Processing" provides a state-of-the-art platform for information communication technology research and development that is of significance to nearly 260 million Bengali-speaking people who live in Bangladesh, India and in diaspora in the Middle East, Europe, and the US. This milestone work includes 16 chapters coauthored by 41 researchers from Bangladesh, Canada, India, Ireland, Norway, the UK, and the US.

Ataul Karim is known for his advocacy and writings to improve ranking of universities in Bangladesh, and for containing questionable journal publication and faculty recruitment practices. He serves on the board of trustees and/or advisory boards of a number of private universities including Ahsanullah University of Science and Technology, North South University, and Metropolitan University, Sylhet and the Board of Regents of the North American Bangladeshi Islamic Community, known for its many projects in education, environment, healthcare, poverty alleviation, and relief and rehabilitation.
