= National Information and Communication Technology Awards =

ICT sector awards given by the Bangladesh government

- Awarded for: Excellence in ICT achievements for Bangladesh
- Sponsored by: Government of Bangladesh
- Location: Dhaka
- Country: Bangladesh
- Presented by: Ministry of Posts, Telecommunications and Information Technology
- First award: 2017
- Website: ictd.gov.bd

National Information and Communication Technology Awards (Bengali: জাতীয় তথ্য ও যোগাযোগ প্রযুক্তি পুরস্কার) is the only state and highest prize in the Information and Communication Technology sector of Bangladesh. The award is being given since 2017.

== History ==
The first award was given on 12 December 2017, on the first 'Information and Communication Technology Day'. The Government of Bangladesh provides the National Information and Communication Technology Awards to individuals and organizations for significant contributions to the development and development of the ICT industry. The winners are awarded crests as prizes. Before that on 2016 National ICT awards given at Digital World program by the government.

== Awards by year ==
=== 2017 ===
Nine individuals and six organizations received awards in 2017:

- Muhammad Zafar Iqbal, (lifetime achievement)
- Annisul Huq, special honor (posthumous)
- Abul Kalam Azad, (health category)
- Begum Umme Salam Tanjia (civil service)
- Sheikh Abdul Aziz (Bangladesh), (software innovation)
- The City Bank (online banking)
- Service Engine Limited (software export)
- Shahjalal University of Science and Technology (education on ICT)
- Sheba.xyz (start-up in ICT)
- Toufique Imrose Khalidi, (journalism in a special category)
- Department of Agricultural Extension, (providing information services to farmers using mobile phone)
- Dhaka North City Corporation (DNCC), (for contribution to provide service to people using ICT)
- Pantho Rahaman (journalism)
- Muhammad Khan (journalism)
- Mahmudul Hasan Raju (journalism)

=== 2016 ===
- Syed Akhter Hossain (ICT Education and Technology)
- Mohammad Abdul Haque (journalism)
