= Pantho Rahaman =

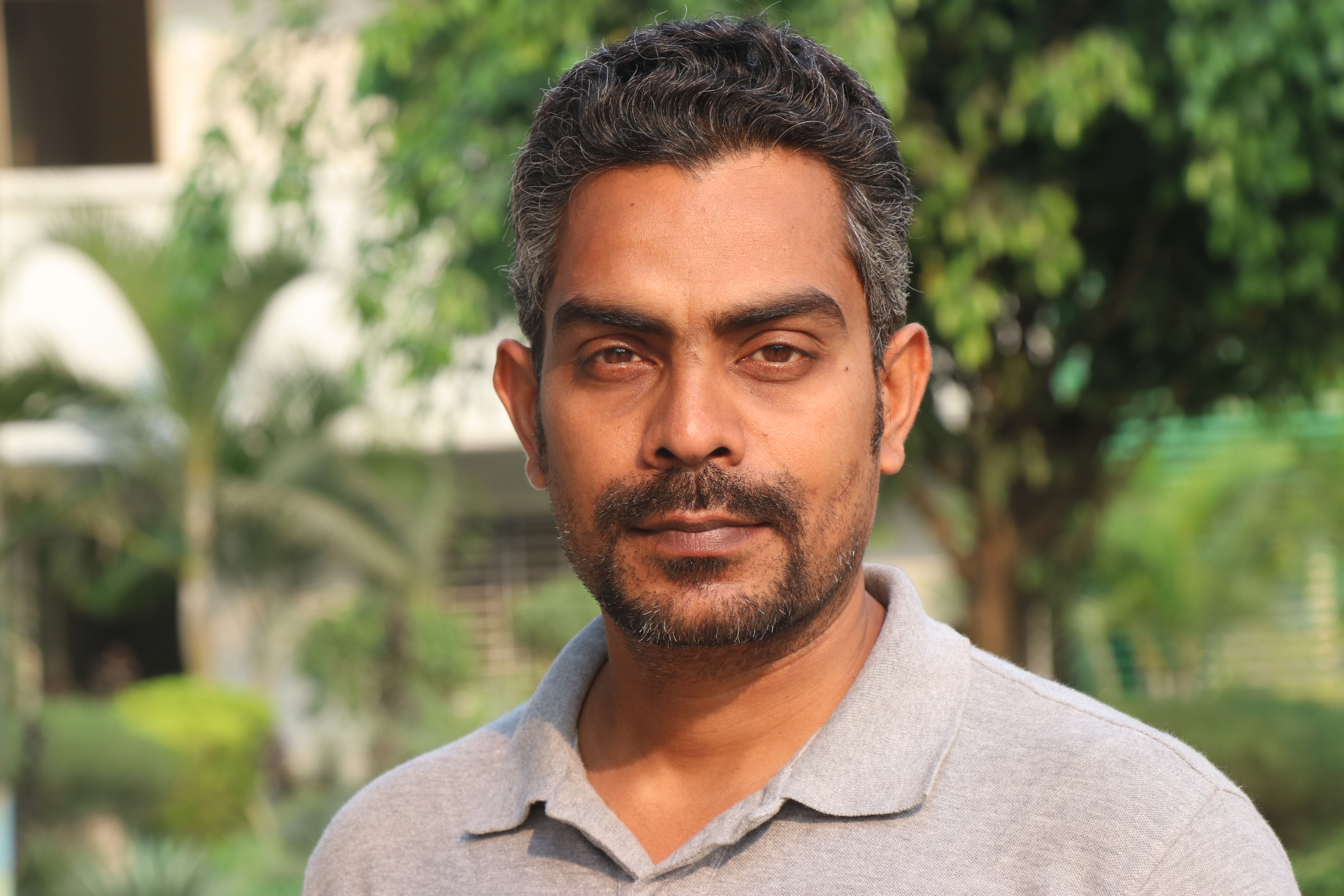
- Born: 11 September 1980 (age 45); Rajbari, Bangladesh
- Education: University of Dhaka
- Occupation: Journalism
- Known for: Journalist
- Office: Channel I
- Awards: National ICT Award, 2017

Faridur Rahaman better known as Pantho Rahaman (11 September 1980) is a Bangladeshi journalist. He work as special correspondent of Channel i. He has received the National ICT Award for the year 2017, for his special contribution in ICT journalism. He is the president of Diplomatic Correspondents Association Bangladesh for the year 2021.

== Organization ==
He has been elected twice as general secretary of Diplomatic Correspondents Association, Bangladesh (DCAB), a diplomat journalist organization in Bangladesh.

== Awards ==
- National ICT Award, 2017
