= Chowdhury Mofizur Rahman =

Bangladeshi academic and university administrator

Chowdhury Mofizur Rahman is a Bangladeshi academic and vice-chancellor of State University of Bangladesh. He is the former vice chancellor of United International University. He is the former pro-vice chancellor of United International University.

== Early life ==
Rahman was born in 1965 in Dhaka. He graduated from Notre Dame College, Dhaka. He did his bachelor's degree in electrical and electronic engineering and master's in computer science at the Bangladesh University of Engineering and Technology in 1989 and 1992 respectively. He completed his PhD in machine learning at the Tokyo Institute of Technology in 1996. He had received the Monbukagakusho Scholarship.

== Career ==
Rahman joined the CSE Department of the Bangladesh University of Engineering and Technology. From 2000 to 2001, he was the head of the CSE Department.

Rahman was one of the founders of United International University in 2003 after retiring from Bangladesh University of Engineering and Technology. He was appointed pro-vice chancellor of United International University and served three terms. In 2009, he was a visiting professor at the University of Bradford.

From 2008 to 2022, Rahman was the vice chancellor of United International University. He is an adviser to the board of trustees of United International University. He was appointed vice-chancellor of State University of Bangladesh on 1 October 2023.
