= Shibli Mohammad =

Bangladeshi dancer (born 1970)

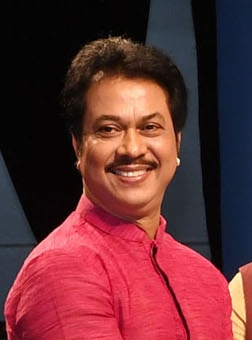
- Shibli Mohammad in 2022.
- Born: 4 September 1965 (age 61)
- Education: BSc (Physics)
- Alma mater: Jahangir Nagar University
- Occupations: Dancer, choreographer
- Relatives: Sadi Mohammad (brother)
- Awards: full list

Shibli Mohammad (born 4 September 1965) is a Bangladeshi dancer and choreographer. He is the co-director of "Nrityanchal Dance Company".

== Early life and education ==
Mohammad was born on 4 September 1965 in Mohammadpur, Dhaka to Shahid Salimullah (d. March 26, 1971) and Begum Jebunnesa Salimullah (d. 2023).

Mohammad completed his bachelor's in physics from Jahangir Nagar University. He took dance lessons from Kartic Singh, Ajit Dey and Anita Dey at the Chhayanaut in Dhaka. He was awarded an Indian Government scholarship to train. He was taught by Shreemati Purnima Pande at the Bhatkhande Music Institute in Lucknow, India. Next he studied under Birju Maharaj in National Institute of Kathak Dance in New Delhi. He also received training in ballet and contemporary dance, as well as tap and jazz for a year at the London Ballet Theatre School.

== Career ==
Mohammad was the principal male dancer at the Shilpakala Academy. Since 2007, he and Shamim Ara Nipa have been running a television show Tarana on BTV.

== Personal life ==
Mohammad has 9 siblings, 4 sisters Parvin (died 2022), Nasreen, twins Yasmeen & Nazneen and 5 brothers Shahjahan, Shameem, Sadi (died 2024), Shoeb & Sohail. He is the 5th sibling.

His father, Salimullah, was killed during the Liberation War of Bangladesh on March 26, 1971. His elder brothers Shahjahan, Shameem and Sadi and elder sister Parvin Alam are all deceased.

== Awards ==
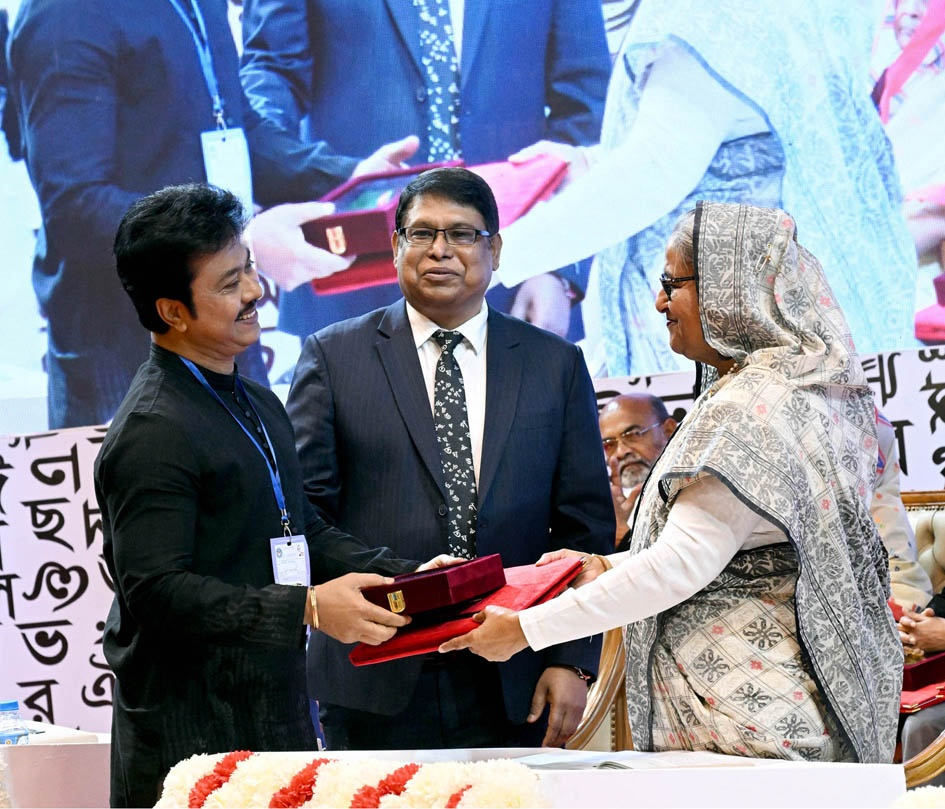
- Mohammad receives Ekushay Padak from Sheikh Hasina in 2024.
  Ekushey Padak 2024
- Shilpakala Padak 2020
- UNESCO award for Best Bangladeshi dancer
- George Harrison Award for Dance
- Jaijaidin Award
- Bachsas Award
- Prothom Alo Award
- Lux Channel I Award
