= University of Asia Pacific =

Bangladeshi University

University of Asia Pacific - UAP
- Motto: "Committed to excellence"
- Type: Private
- Established: 1996
- Accreditation: ACU; WA; IEB; IAUP; IAB; PCB
- Affiliations: University Grants Commission (UGC)
- Chancellor: President Mirza Fakhrul Islam Alamgir
- Vice-Chancellor: Qumrul Ahsan
- Faculty: 312
- Students: 6488
- Undergraduates: 5710
- Postgraduates: 778
- Location: 74/A, Green Road, Farmgate, Dhaka-1205, Bangladesh; 23.7548°N 90.3894°E
- Campus: Urban
- Website: www.uap-bd.edu

University rankings

Regional – Overall
- QS Asia: 901-950 (2026)

University of Asia Pacific (Bengali: ইউনিভার্সিটি অব এশিয়া প্যাসিফিক), often abbreviated UAP, is a private university located at Dhaka, Bangladesh.

== History ==
The University of Asia Pacific was established in 1995 as a private university under the Private University Act 1992 with Hedayat Ahmed as the founder Vice Chancellor. Its curriculum has been approved by The University Grants Commission of the Government of the People's Republic of Bangladesh. The university started its operation in the first semester of classes in 1996 and offered four-year bachelor's degree programs in Computer Science and Technology and Business Administration only. Now UAP offers undergraduate programs in English, Law, Architecture, Business Administration, Civil Engineering, Computer Science and Engineering, Electrical and Electronic Engineering and Pharmacy.

UAP has been sponsored by the University of Asia Pacific Foundation, a non-profit, non-commercial organization based in Dhaka, Bangladesh. Mohammed Alauddin is the current chairperson of the Board of Governors of the University of Asia Pacific Foundation.

== Schools and departments ==
University of Asia Pacific has nine academic departments under seven schools.

1. School of Engineering
  - Department of Computer Science and Engineering
  - Department of Civil Engineering
  - Department of Electrical and Electronic Engineering
2. School of Environmental Science and Design
  - Department of Architecture
3. School of Business,
  - Department of Business Administration
4. School of Humanities and Social Science
  - Department of English
5. School of Law
  - Department of Law and Human Rights
6. School of Medicine
  - Department of Pharmacy
7. School of Science
  - Department of Basic Sciences and Humanities

== Lab facilities ==
- Electric and circuit lab
- Materials lab
- Physics lab
- Structural mechanics and earthquake engineering lab
- Hydraulics lab
- Geo technical engineering lab
- Environmental engineering lab
- Chemistry lab
- Pharmaceutical technology research lab
- Microbiology research lab

== List of vice-chancellors ==
1. Hedayat Ahmed (September 1995 – June 2001)
2. A. S. M Shahjahan
3. M. R. Kabir (March 2003 – September 2004)
4. Abdul Matin Patwari (7 September 2004 – 2012)
5. Jamilur Reza Choudhury (2 May 2012 – 28 April 2020)
6. Md. Sultan Mahmud (17 December 2020 – 14 February 2022)
7. Qumrul Ahsan (15 February 2022 – present)

== Grading system ==
| Numerical grade | Letter grade | Assessment | Grade point |
|---|---|---|---|
| 80% and above | A+ | (A Plus) | 4.00 |
| 75% to less than 80% | A | (A Regular) | 3.75 |
| 70% to less than 75% | A− | (A Minus) | 3.50 |
| 65% to less than 70% | B+ | (B Plus) | 3.25 |
| 60% to less than 65% | B | (B Regular) | 3.00 |
| 55% to less than 60% | B− | (B Minus) | 2.75 |
| 50% to less than 55% | C+ | (C Plus) | 2.50 |
| 45% to less than 50% | C | (C Regular) | 2.25 |
| 40% to less than 45% | D | - | 2.00 |
| Less than 40% | F | - | 0.00 |
| Exemption | E | - | - |
| Incomplete | I | - | - |
