= Sadi Mohammad =

Bangladeshi composer 4 October 1955 – 13 March 2024)

- সাদি মহম্মদ
- Born: 4 October 1955
- Died: March 13, 2024 (aged 68)
- Cause of death: Suicide by hanging
- Education: Visva-Bharati University (Bachelor's and Master's degree); Bangladesh University of Engineering and Technology
- Occupation: Singer
- Relatives: Shibli Mohammad (brother)
- Awards: full list

Sadi Mohammad (4 October 1955 – 13 March 2024) was a Bangladeshi Rabindra Sangeet singer and composer. He served as the director of the cultural organization, Rabi Raag.

== Life and career ==
In 1973, after the war of liberation, Sadi Mohammad was admitted to the Civil Engineering Department of Bangladesh University of Engineering & Technology. However, he did not continue his studies there. Later, he got a scholarship to study music at Santiniketan in 1975. After that, he took his graduation and post-graduation degrees in Rabindra Sangeet from Visva-Bharati University. There he learned music from Santidev Ghose and Kanika Banerjee.

In 2007, Mohammad debuted as a music composer when he released the album Amakey Khujey Pabey Bhorer Shishirey. He released the albums Srabon Akashey in 2009 and Sharthok Janom Amar in 2012.

Mohammad served as the director of the organization Rabi Raag.

== Personal life and death ==
Mohammad had nine siblings, 4 sisters Parvin, Nasreen, twins Yasmeen & Nazneen and 5 brothers Shahjahan, Shameem, Shibli, Shoeb & Sohail. He is the 4th sibling. His elder brothers Shahjahan & Shameem and elder sister Parvin Alam are all deceased. His father, Salimullah, was killed during the Liberation War of Bangladesh in 1971.

Sadi Mohammad committed suicide on 13 March 2024. According to Shibli, his younger brother, Sadi had been practicing music with his tanpura instrument in his room and later his hanging body was found after breaking in. Shibli mentioned that Sadi had been mentally struggling after their mother, Jebunnessa Salimullah, had died in July 2023. Sadi Mohammad's nephew Syed Gousl Alam Shaon confirmed that he was also very depressed when his older sister, Parveen Alam died in late 2022. Shaon also confirmed that Sadi Mohammad did some counselling before he died, but Shibli mentioned whenever Sadi was told he needed counseling, Sadi would threaten to kill himself, which is why he didn't receive enough counseling. Sadi’s suicide was the tragic breaking point after a lifetime of mental trauma, including witnessing his father’s fatal death.

== Awards ==
- Lifetime Achievement Award by Channel i (2012)
- Rabindra Award by Bangla Academy (2015)
