= High schools in Bangladesh =

High schools in Bangladesh are institutions where 11–16 year olds take their lessons. There are approximately 23,500+ high schools in Bangladesh. Bangla version

== History ==
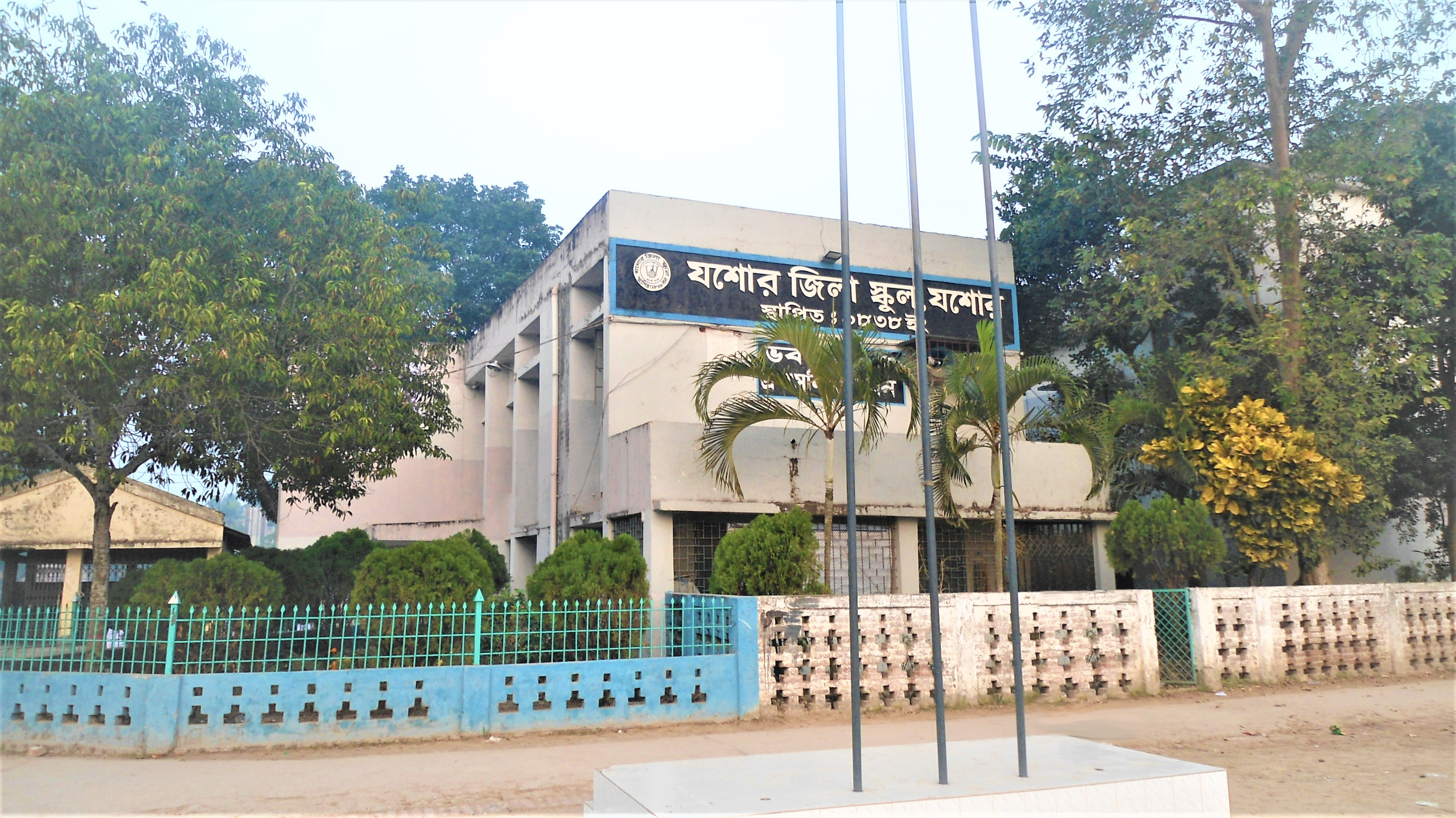
British architectural School building, Jashore School

Rajshahi Collegiate School (1828) is the first and oldest school in the country. The seven oldest high schools in Bangladesh, by year of establishment, are: Barisal Zilla School (1829), Dhaka Collegiate School (1835), Kendua Joyhari Spry Government High School (1832), Rangpur Zilla School (1832), Rajshahi Collegiate School (1828), Sylhet Government Pilot High School (1836), Chattogram Collegiate School (1836), Comilla Zilla School (1837) and Jashore Zilla School (1838).

| School name | Established | Address | Board |
|---|---|---|---|
| Rajshahi Collegiate School | 1828 | Rajshahi | Rajshahi |
| Barisal Zilla School | 1829 | Barishal | Barishal |
| Kendua Joyhari Spry Govt. High School | 1832 | Kendua, Netrokona | Mymensingh |
| Rangpur Zilla School | 1832 | Rangpur | Dinajpur |
| Dhaka Collegiate School | 1835 | Dhaka | Dhaka |
| Sylhet Government Pilot High School | 1836 | Sylhet | Sylhet |
| Chattogram Collegiate School | 1836 | Chattogram | Chattogram |
| Comilla Zilla School | 1837 | Comilla | Comilla |
| Jashore Zilla School | 1838 | Jashore | Jashore |

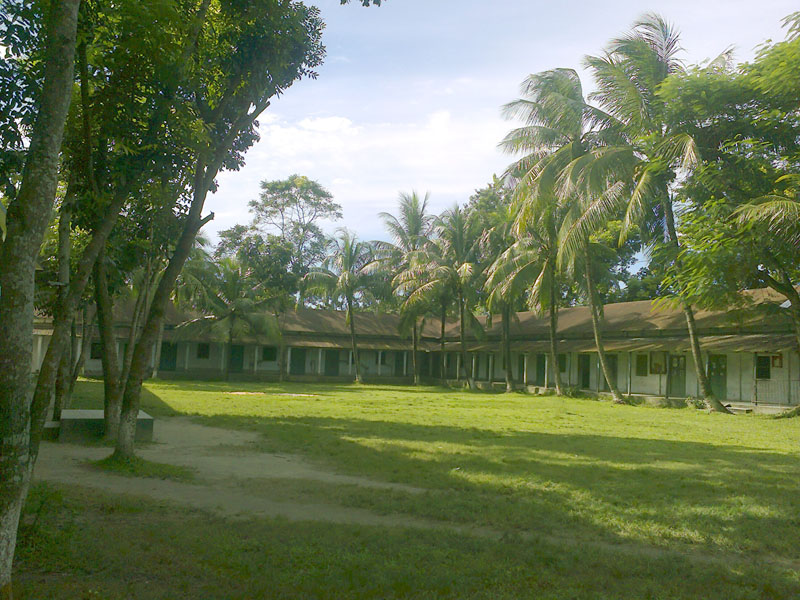
Kendua Joyhari Spry Govt. High School, one of the ancient schools of Bangladesh, located at the heart of Kendua Upazilla, Netrokona.

== High school education system in Bangladesh ==
The education system in Bangladesh is divided into four stages. The second level is high school which incorporates grade 6 to 10. There are both English medium and Bangla medium school in Bangladesh. Government prefer Bangla medium schools. Though there are some cadet colleges which are also government owned institutions and they offer English medium studies. Usually, the private schools offer English medium.

=== Bangla medium ===
Bangla medium schools follow the national curriculum, examinations are Secondary School Certificate (SSC) and Higher Secondary School Certificate (HSC).

=== English Version ===
English Version schools follow the national curriculum and have similar examinations, such as SSC and HSC, but the medium of teaching is English language.

=== English medium ===
English medium schools in Bangladesh follow the Cambridge International Examinations (CIE) curriculum or the Edexcel curriculum. Examinations are O-Levels and A-Levels. They are governed by Private (English medium) School and College Ordinance 1962 and the Private English Medium School Registration Rules, 2007.

== Number of high schools ==
There are seven education boards in Bangladesh. Every high school has a particular education board. The number of high schools for every education board are given below.

| Educational Board | Number of High Schools |
|---|---|
| Dhaka | 3549 |
| Rajshahi | 4607 |
| Comilla | 1483 |
| Jessore | 2274 |
| Chittagong | 876 |
| Barishal | 1396 |
| Sylhet | 645 |

== See also ==
- Education in Bangladesh
