= Southeast University (Bangladesh) =

Private University in Dhaka, Bangladesh

- সাউথইস্ট বিশ্ববিদ্যালয়
- Logo of Southeast University
- Motto: Meeting the challenges of Time
- Type: Private
- Established: 2002; 24 years ago
- Affiliations: UGC, IEB, IAB, PCB, BBC
- Chairman: Md. Rezaul Karim
- Chancellor: President Mirza Fakhrul Islam Alamgir
- Vice-Chancellor: Yusuf Mahbubul Islam
- Academic staff: 474
- Students: 12,000
- Location: 251/A & 252, Tejgaon Industrial Area, Dhaka, 1208, Bangladesh; 23.7692668°N 90.4049922°E
- Campus: Urban, 56,700 sq ft (5,270 m^{2})
- Colors: Yellow
- Website: seu.edu.bd

University rankings

Regional – Overall
- QS Asia: 741-750 (2026)

Southeast University (Bengali: সাউথইস্ট বিশ্ববিদ্যালয়) is a private university in Tejgaon Industrial Area, Dhaka, Bangladesh. The university was established in 2002. SEU ranked 10th among Top Private universities in Dhaka Tribune's Private University Ranking 2019.

== History and administration ==
Southeast University (SEU) was established in June 2002 as a private university under the Private University Act 1992. The President of Bangladesh is the chancellor. The university is run by a number of statutory bodies as required under the provisions of the Private University Act, 1992.

== List of vice-chancellors ==
- AFM Mafizul Islam
- Yusuf Mahbubul Islam (present)

== Academics ==
Southeast University offers the following undergraduate, post graduate programs and diploma courses:

=== School of Engineering ===
- Bachelor of Architecture
- Bachelor of Science in Computer Science & Engineering
- Bachelor of Science in Software Engineering
- Bachelor of Science in Electronic and Electrical Engineering
- Bachelor of Science in Textile Engineering

=== School of Science ===
- Bachelor of Pharmacy

=== School of Information Technology ===
- Bachelor of Science in Information and Communication Technology

=== School of Business Studies ===
- Bachelor of Business Administration
- Master of Business Administration (Regular)
- Master of Business Administration (Executive)
- Master of Business Administration (only for BBA students)

=== School of Law ===
- 1 year Master of Laws: 1 year LL.M
- 2 year Master of Laws: 2 year LL.M
- 4 year Bachelor of Laws: LL.B (Hons)

=== School of Arts and Social Science ===
- BA (Hons) in English
- MA in English
- BA (Hons) in Bangla
- Bachelor of Social Sciences in Economics
- Master of Development Studies
- Master of Arts in Bangla

=== Distance education ===
The distance education programs were discontinued to be compliant with the directives of Bangladesh Ministry of Education.

== Library ==
Southeast University is linked with journal publishers through an international organisation named INASP/PERii. Bangladesh Academy of Sciences (BAS) is acting as the coordinating body. This facility is IP based and work only within SEU campus. The SEU library offers regular services such as circulation, reference, counseling, indexing, bibliographical documentation, back up services, retrospective searches etc.

Southeast University has a library equipped with books on the academic programs offered as well as on research and extracurricular activities. The total collection of books and journals at is about 15000. The space area of the library is 6,500 square feet (600 m^{2}). It is a central library of the university rendering services to the students and faculty.

== Terms and grading ==
Southeast University is modeled on the North American Open Credit system. It maintains tri-semester (term) year with the exception of the Department of Pharmacy which maintains a bi-semester year. Southeast University semester timeline is as follow:

- Spring: January - April (starting on the second Sunday of January)
- Summer: May - August (starting on the second Sunday of May)
- Fall: September - December (starting on the second Sunday of September)

Letter grades indicating the quality of course work completed are interpreted as follows:

Class Intervals of Scores	Letter Grade	Grade Points
80 – 100	A+	4.00
75 - 79	A	3.75
70 – 74	A-	3.50
65 – 69	B+	3.25
60 – 64	B	3.00
55 - 59	B-	2.75
50 – 54	C+	2.50
45 – 49	C	2.25
40 – 44	D	2.00
Less than 40	F	0.00

Traditional class equivalent as per MOE, GOB, notification dated 02.06.2009: GPA 3.00-4.00= 1st class GPA 2.25-2.99= 2nd class GPA 1.65-2.24= 3rd class

== Scholarships opportunities ==
SEU offers partial to full tuition fee waiver based on outstanding HSC or A-Level result. But the result based waiver is not applicable in case of break of study. Also each semester the top ranked students from every department based on semester GPA gets partial financial assistance. Limited need based financial assistance program is available for students with more than 3.00 semester GPA. Children of Freedom Fighters are eligible for full tuition waiver & it remains valid in the subsequent semesters if the semester result is within the requirement.

== Affiliations and membership ==
SEU has international relations and affiliations with other associations and universities around the world. SEU has international collaboration or MoU signed with these universities:

- University of Manchester, UK
- Yunnan University of Finance and Economics, China
- Wuhan Textile University, China
- Shinshu University, Japan
- Kunming University of Science and Technology, China

The university is member of some prestigious professional bodies including:

- Institution of Engineers, Bangladesh (IEB)
- University Grants Commission of Bangladesh (UGC)
- Institute of Architects Bangladesh (IAB)
- Pharmacy Council of Bangladesh (PCB)

== Notable people ==
=== Faculty ===
- Syed Alamgir, businessman
- Shahriar Manzoor, Bangladeshi competitive programmer and computer scientist

=== Alumni ===
- Bidya Sinha Saha Mim, actress
- Pritom Hasan, actor
- Keya Payel, actress
- Mir Snigdho, Aspiring politician.

== Gallery ==
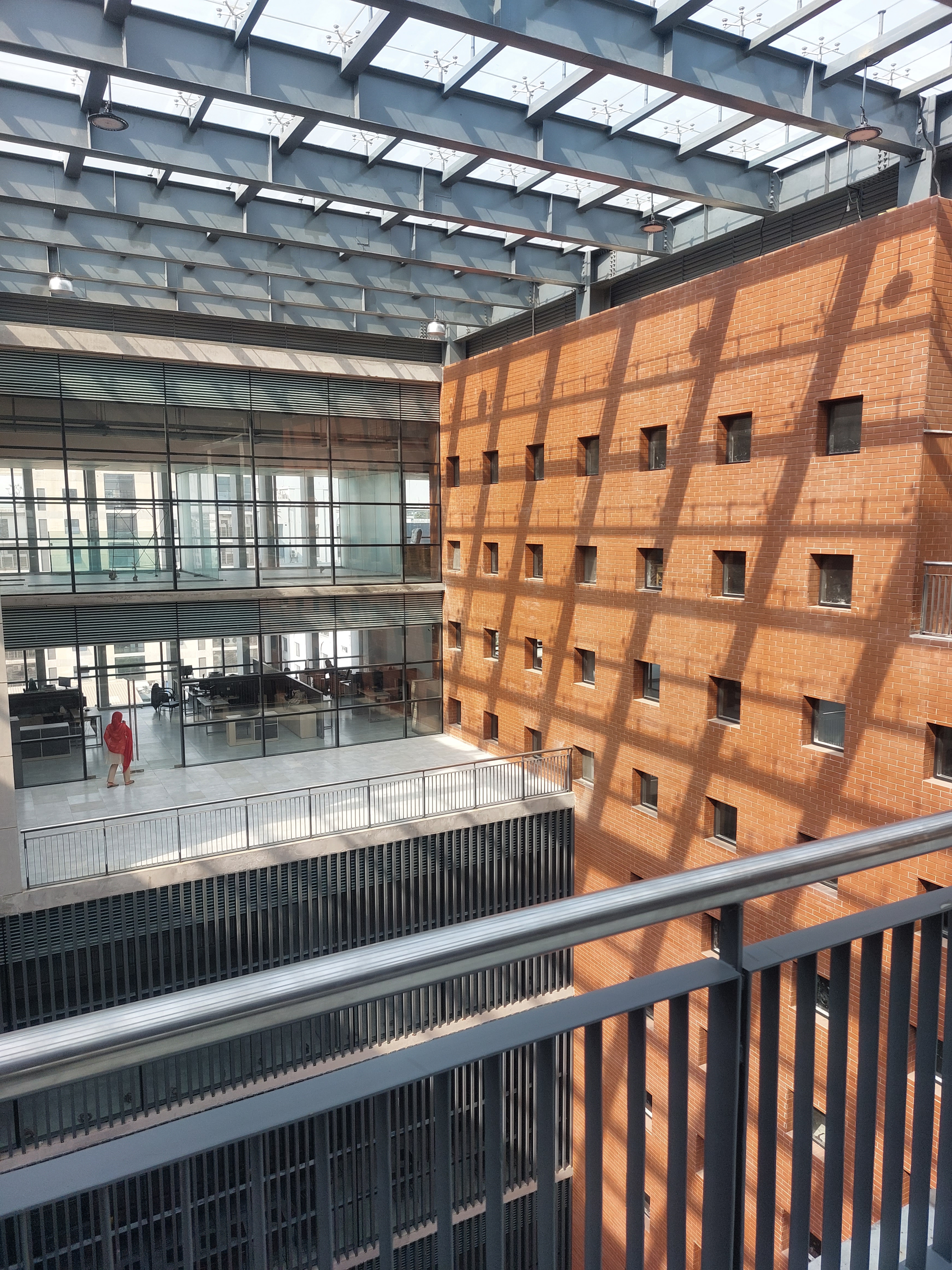
Inside View of SEU

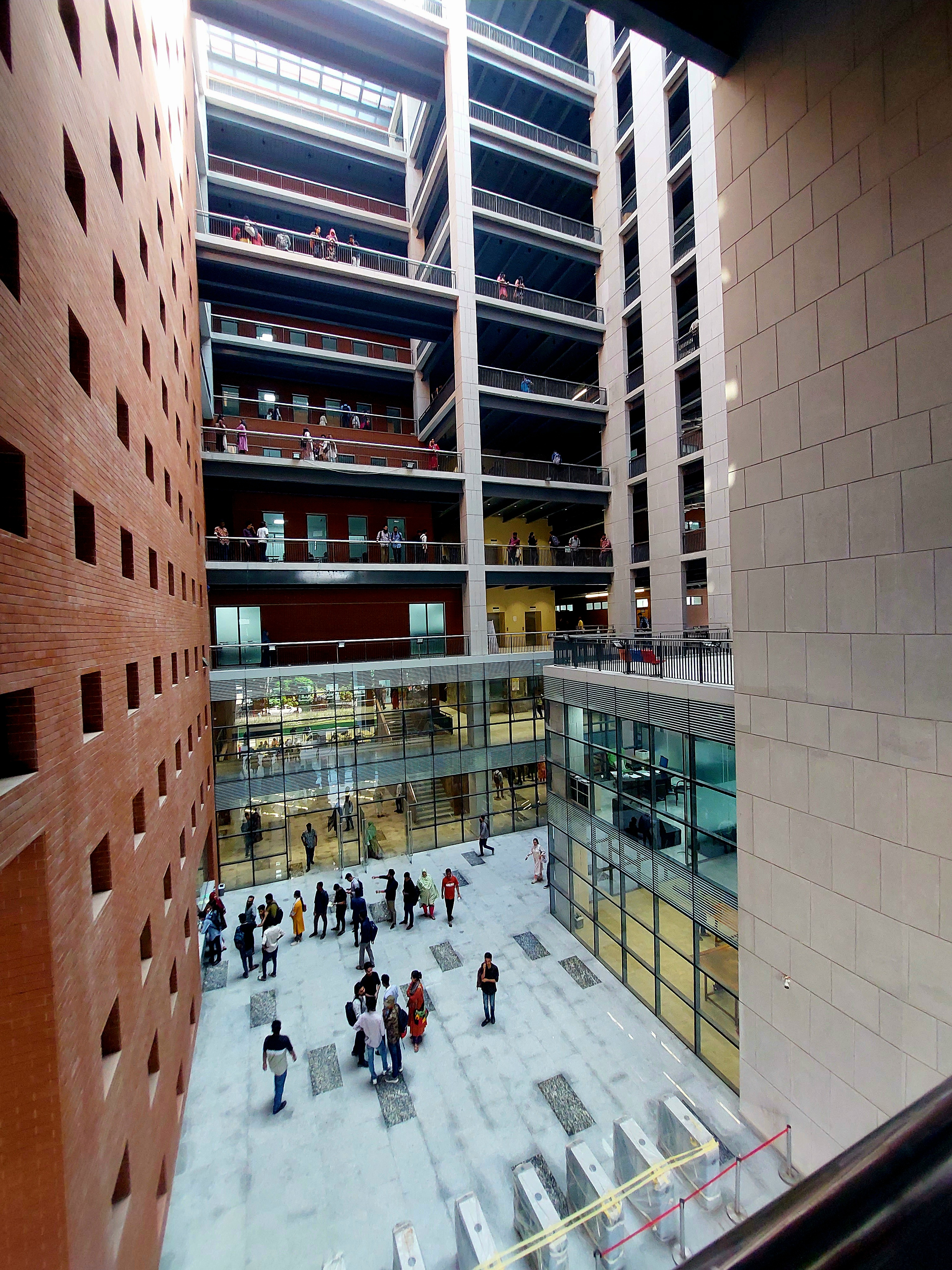
New Building, SEU.

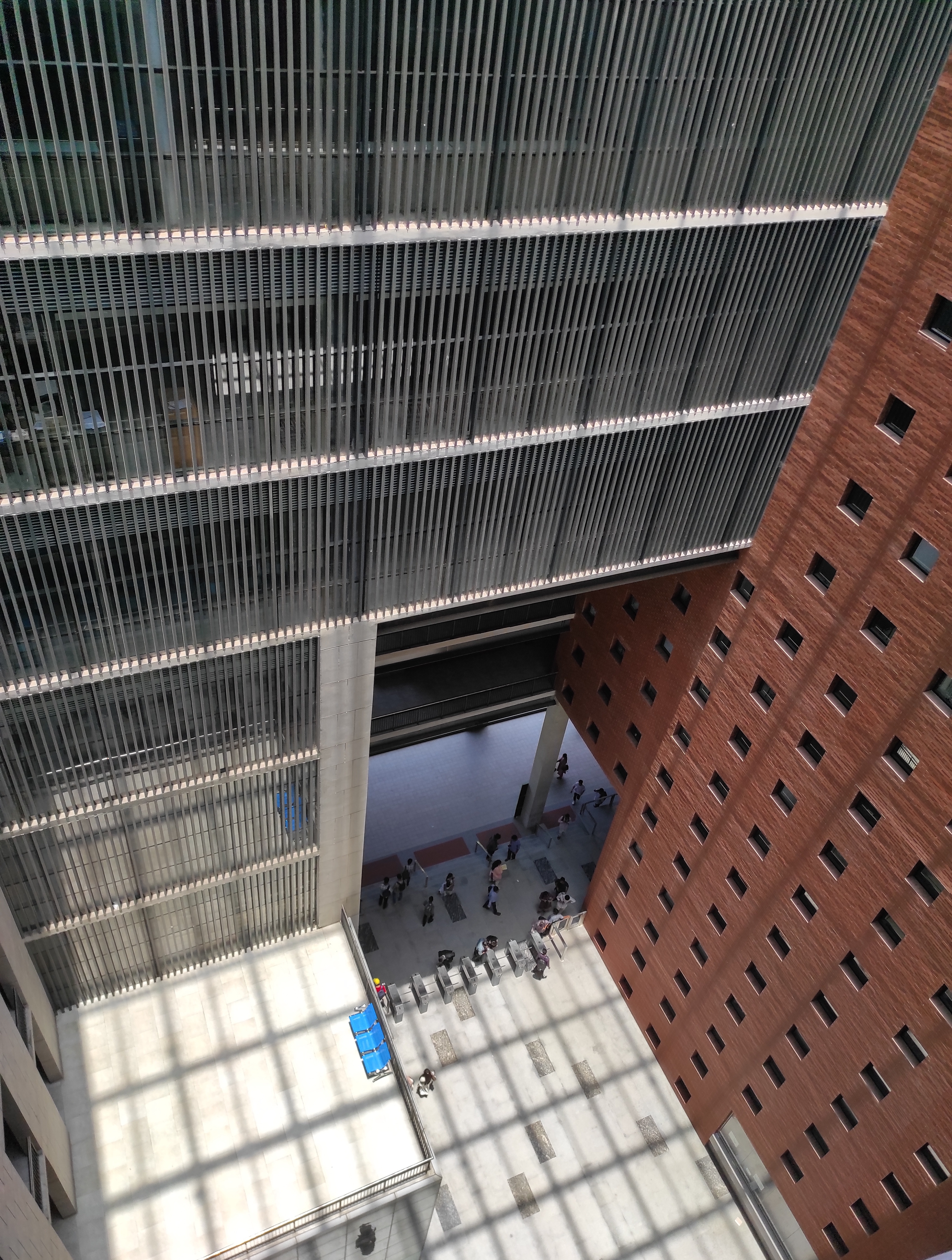
Inside the main building

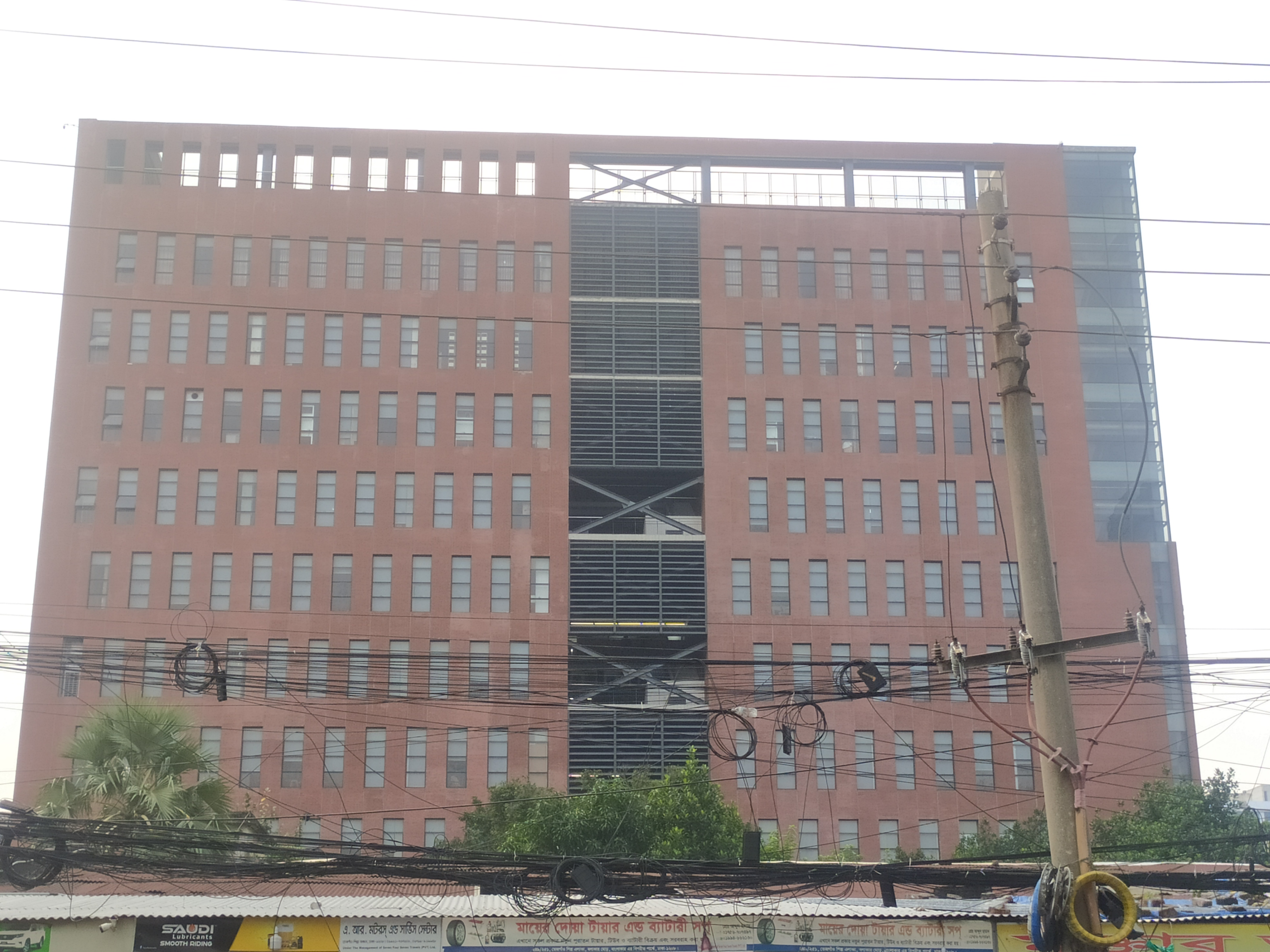
