= Madani Avenue =

Street in Dhaka, Bangladesh

Coordinates: 23.796511°N 90.419360°E

- 100 feet Road
- Interactive map of Madani Avenue
- Former name: Madani Avenue
- Namesake: Ghulam Ali Madani, chairman of Dhaka Improvement Trust (now RAJUK)
- Maintained by: Dhaka North City Corporation
- Length: 7 km (4.3 mi)
- Location: Dhaka, Bangladesh
- Postal code: 1212
- West end: Baridhara
- East end: Dhaka–Sylhet highway

Madani Avenue is an urban road situated in Dhaka, the capital of Bangladesh. The street is named after G.A. Madani, who was chairman of Dhaka Improvement Trust in East Pakistan (currently RAJUK). The road starts from the US Embassy in Baridhara and is 100 feet wide. Its length is 7 kilometers. The proposed two link roads will connect the road with the Purbachal Expressway.

The road widening project was undertaken on September 25, 2016. Under this project, the road will be made six lanes and will be extended up to Balu River. In future, people can gain entry from Madani Avenue to Dhaka–Chittagong highway through Purbachal.

Future planned MRT Line 5 of Dhaka Metro Rail will have at least one station in Madani Avenue. UIU located in this road.
