= United International University =

Private university in Dhaka, Bangladesh

- ইউনাইটেড ইন্টারন্যাশনাল ইউনিভার্সিটি
- Crest of United International University
- Other name: UIU
- Motto: Quest for Excellence
- Type: Private, Research
- Established: 2003; 23 years ago
- Accreditation: IEB; PCB; ACBSP
- Affiliations: University Grants Commission (UGC)
- Chancellor: President Mirza Fakhrul Islam Alamgir
- Vice-Chancellor: Md. Abul Kashem Mia
- Faculty: 320 (full-time faculty members), 100 (adjunct faculty members). Total – 420
- Students: More than 7000 undergraduate and graduate students Running
- Location: United City, Madani Avenue, Badda, Dhaka, 1212, Bangladesh; 23°47′53″N 90°26′59″E
- Campus: Urban, 8.25 acres (3.34 ha)
- Language: English
- Colours: Orange
- Website: uiu.ac.bd

University rankings

Global – Overall
- QS World: 1401+ (2026)

Regional – Overall
- QS Asia: 651 (2026)

United International University (Bengali: ইউনাইটেড ইন্টারন্যাশনাল ইউনিভার্সিটি, also known as UIU) is a private research university in Dhaka, Bangladesh.

== History ==
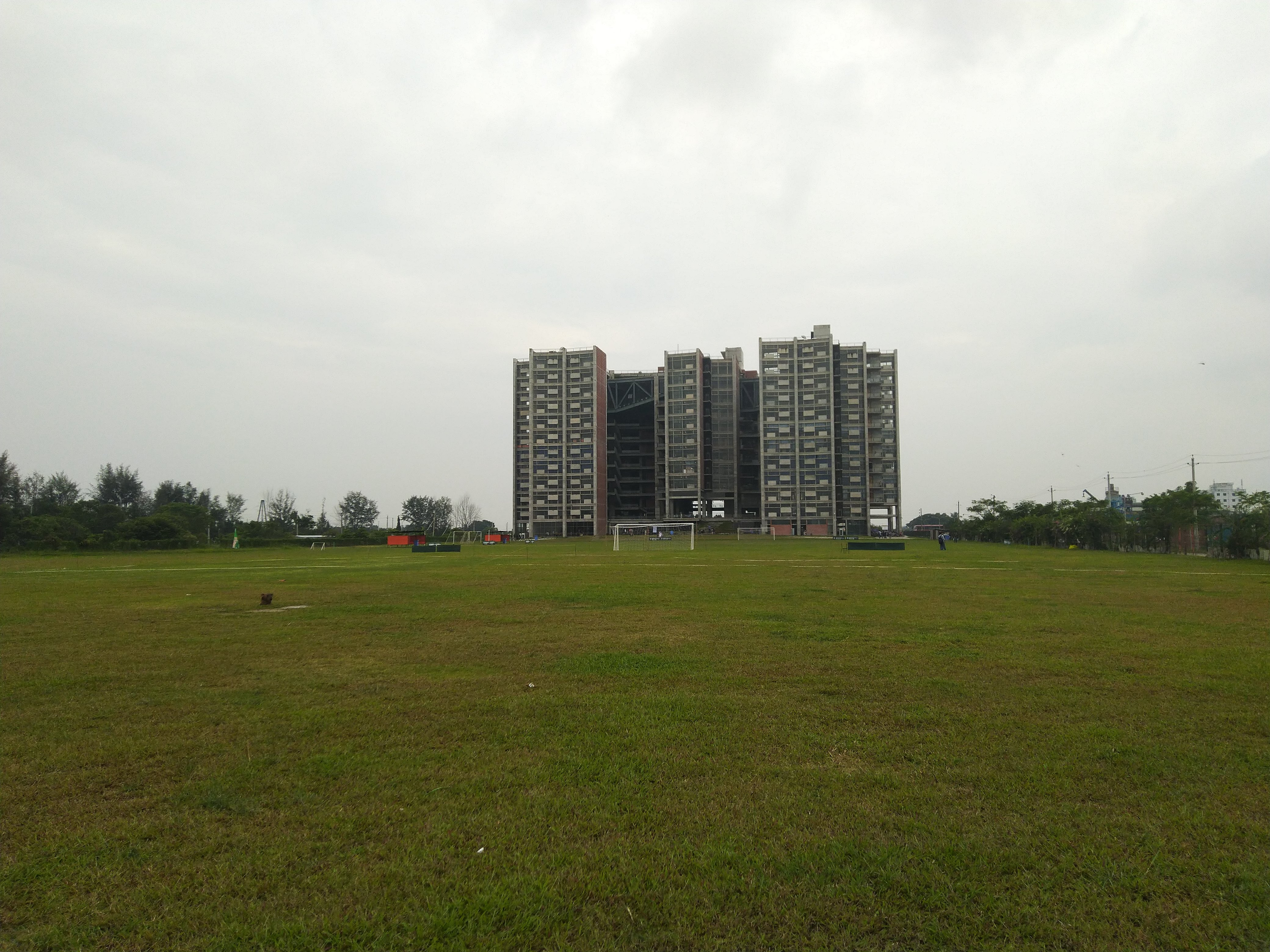
Campus Aerial view

The government of Bangladesh approved the establishment of United International University in 2003. United International University was established with the generous support and patronage of the United Group.

== Campus ==
The permanent campus is on a 25-bigha (8.25 acre) plot of land, located at the 'United City' at Satarkul, Badda (1.5 km east of Embassy of the United States, Dhaka), adjacent to Madani Avenue.

== Academics ==
- School of Science & Engineering (SoSE)
- School of Life Sciences
- School of Business and Economics (SoBE), accredited by the Accreditation Council for Business Schools and Programs (ACBSP).
- School of Humanities and Social Science (SoHSS)

== Research Center ==
- Center for Energy Research (CER)
- Biomedical Engineering Center
- Center for Emerging Networks and Technologies Research (CENTeR)
- Brain-Computer Interface(BCI) Research Lab

== List of vice-chancellors ==
- Chowdhury Mofizur Rahman
- Md. Abul Kashem Mia

== Notable faculty ==
- Dr. M. Rezwan Khan, Professor Emeritus, Dept. of EEE & Director, IAR.

== Accreditation ==
As of May 2023, it is one of three Bangladeshi universities to be accredited by ACBSP. The academic programs of the university are recognized by the following organizations:

- University Grants Commission, Bangladesh (UGC)
- Institution of Engineers, Bangladesh (IEB)
- Chartered Institute of Management Accountants (CIMA)
- Accreditation Council For Business Schools And Programs (ACBSP)

== Controversies ==
On 26 April 2025, United International University Vice Chancellor Prof Abul Kashem Mia and 11 departmental heads resigned amid ongoing student protests at the university’s Bhatara Madani Avenue campus. The demonstrations were sparked by grievances over exam policies, including reduced test durations, unchanged improvement fees, and handling a student’s request for a make-up exam following a family bereavement. While the students cited administrative insensitivity and financial burdens, the university officials stated they resigned in protest against what they called “undue” and “unjust” demands. The Board of Trustees of United International University formed an independent fact-finding committee to investigate the incidents. Chaired by Professor Md Mujibur Rahman, the committee is expected to submit a report within seven working days, based on a thorough and impartial review of evidence and testimonies.
