= Şəhriyar =

Şəhriyar or Shagriyar or Shakhriar or Shakhriyar may refer to:

- Şəhriyar, Goygol, Azerbaijan
- Şəhriyar, Masally, Azerbaijan
- Şəhriyar, Nakhchivan (disambiguation)

- Şəhriyar, Ordubad, Azerbaijan
- Şəhriyar, Sharur, Azerbaijan

- Şəhriyar, Sabirabad, Azerbaijan

== See also ==
- Shahriar
- Shahriyar
- Shagriar
