= Shahriyar =

Shahriyar or variants may refer to:

== Places ==
- Shahriar, Tehran province, Iran
  - Shahriar County
- Shahriar, Chaharmahal and Bakhtiari, Iran
- Shahriar, Fars, Iran
- Shahriar-e Tavakkoli, Fars Province, Iran
- Shahriar, Lorestan, Iran
- Shagriar (disambiguation), various towns in Armenia
- Shahryar (crater), on Saturn's moon Enceladus

== People ==
- Abu Hasan Shahriar (born 1959), Bangladeshi poet
- Shahryar (poet) (1936-2012), film lyricist known for the 1981 film Umrao Jaan
- Masum Shahriar (active beginning 1999), Bangladeshi television director and screenwriter
- Mohammad-Hossein Shahriar (1906–1988), Iranian poet who used the pen name Shahriar
- Munim Shahriar (born 1998), Bangladeshi cricketer
- Nasser Shahrear Zahedee (born 1957), Bangladeshi politician
- Hassan Shahriar (1946–2021), Bangladeshi columnist and political analyst
- Hossain Mokbul Shahriar (born 1974), Bangladeshi politician
- Ishaq Shahryar (1936–2009), Afghan ambassador to the United States
- Ivan Shahriar (active 2017), Bangladeshi choreographer
- Rezwan Shahriar Sumit (active 2021), Bangladeshi filmmaker
- Shahriyar (son of Khosrow II) (active circa 600s), Sassanid prince and the father of Yazdegerd III, the last king of the Sassanid Persia
- Shahriar Alam (politician) (born 1970), Bangladeshi state minister
- Shahriar Akhter Bulu (active 2005–2006), Bangladeshi politician
- Shahriar Hossain (born 1975), Bangladeshi cricketer
- Shahriar Kabir (born 1950), Bangladeshi journalist
- Shahryar Khan (1934–2024), Pakistani diplomat
- Shahriar Komol (born 1995), Bangladeshi cricketer
- Shakhriyar Mamedyarov (born 1985), Azerbaijani chess player
- Shahriar Manzoor (born 1976), Bangladeshi computer scientist
- Shahryar Mirza (1605–1628), Mughal prince, younger brother of Mughal Emperor Shah Jahan
- Shahriar Nafees (born 1985), Bangladeshi cricketer
- Shahriar Nazim Joy (active beginning 1997), Bangladeshi actor, writer, and director
- Al Sahariar (born 1978), Bangladeshi cricketer
- Shahriar Shafiq (1945–1979), assassinated Iranian navy officer and Ashraf Pahlavi's son
- Shahriar Shahriari (born 1956), American mathematician and professor at Pomona College
- Sultan Shahriar Rashid Khan (died 2010), Bangladeshi army officer

=== Fictional characters ===
- Shahryar (character), fictional king in One Thousand and One Nights

== Other uses ==
- Shahryar (horse)

== See also ==
- Shahriar (disambiguation)
