= Shahriar =

Al Shahriar (Persian: شهریار) may refer to:

== Places ==
=== Cities in Iran ===
- Shahriar, Tehran Province
- Shahriar, East Azerbaijan

=== Counties in Iran ===
- Shahriar County

=== Villages in Iran ===
- Shahriar, Fars
- Shahriar, Lorestan
- Shahriar Kandeh
- Shahriari-ye Olya
- Shahriari-ye Sofla

== People ==
=== Given name ===
- Salman Shah (actor) (real name Chowdhury Muhammad Shahriar Emon; 1971–1996), Bangladeshi film and television actor
- Sheriar Irani or Meher Baba (1894–1969), Indian spiritual master
- Shahriar Moghanlou (born 1994), Iranian footballer
- Shahriar Nafees (born 1985), Bangladeshi cricketer
- Shahriar Afshar (born 1971), Iranian-American physicist
- Shahriar Alam (politician) (born 1970), Bangladeshi politician
- Shahriar Bahrani (born 1951), Iranian film director
- Shahriar Hossain (born 1976), Bangladeshi cricketer
- Shahriar Sayeed Husain, Bangladeshi businessman
- Shahriar Nazim Joy, Bangladeshi actor, writer, and director
- Shahriar Kabir (born 1950), Bangladeshi journalist, filmmaker, human rights activist and author
- Shahriar Mandanipour (born 1957), Iranian writer, journalist and literary theorist
- Shahriar Manzoor (born 1976), Bangladeshi problem setter
- Shahriar Negahdaripour, American electronics engineer
- Shahriar Shafiq (1945–1979), Iranian royal and naval officer
- Shahriar Shirvand (born 1991), Iranian footballer

=== Surname ===
- Abu Hasan Shahriar (born 1959), Bangladeshi poet
- Hassan Shahriar (1946–2021), Bangladeshi journalist
- Maryam Shahriar (born 1966), Iranian film director and scriptwriter
- Munim Shahriar (born 1998), Bangladeshi cricketer
- Seyyed Mohammad-Hossein Behjat Tabrizi (Shahriar) (1906–1988), Iranian Azerbaijani bilingual poet's pen name

=== Middle name ===
- Noshir Sheriarji Gowadia (born 1944), Indian-American spy

== See also ==
- Shahriyar (disambiguation)
