= Maria (daughter of Maurice) =

Daughter of Byzantine emperor Maurice

Maria (Greek: Μαρία) or Maryam was, according to the 12th-century chronicle of Michael the Syrian, a daughter of the Byzantine emperor Maurice, and wife of the Sassanid Persian shah Khosrau II.

== Historicity ==
Shirin. Christian - Queen - Myth of Love. A woman of late antiquity - Historical reality and literary effect (2004) by Wilhelm Baum examines the sources concerning Maria and her relation to another consort of Khosrau II, Shirin. The historical setting for a marital alliance between the Justinian Dynasty and the Sassanids would be 590. At the time Khosrau was an exiled prince who sought assistance from Maurice to claim the throne against Bahrām Chobin.

The Shahnameh by Ferdowsi reports Khosrau and Shirin to have married prior to his exile. Sebeos reports Shirin being a native of Khuzestan, while the Chronicle of Edessa reports Shirin to be an Aramean, implying an origin from Asoristan. The Rawżat aṣ-ṣafāʾ by Mīr-Khvānd has Shirin being originally a servant in a house frequented by Khosrau, and introduced to the future monarch there. They are all later accounts and could be influenced by legends.

Maria is notably absent from Byzantine sources. She appears instead in accounts by the Chronicle of Edessa, Dionysius Telmaharensis (as preserved in the Chronicle of 1234), Muhammad ibn Jarir al-Tabari, Patriarch Eutychius of Alexandria, Ferdowsi, the Chronicle of Seert, Michael the Syrian, Bar-Hebraeus and Mīr-Khvānd. The Chronicle of Seert and Mari ibn Sulaiman are unique in mentioning that Maria was also called "Shirin" and in equating the two figures. Both also feature her as a daughter of Maurice. However, Theophylact Simocatta, the most detailed historical resource on Maurice, never mentions her.

Concerning her age, Baum notes the known facts on Maurice's marriage. Maurice and his wife Constantina were married in August 582. If a legitimate child of Maurice, Maria would be less than eight-years-old in 590. There are nine children of Maurice and Constantina named in primary sources, six sons (Theodosius, Tiberius, Peter, Paul, Justin, Justinian) and three daughters (Anastasia, Theoctiste, Cleopatra).

The Shahnameh features a tale of Maria dying, poisoned by Shirin. Later tales featuring the two as rival queens occur in later texts. In several cases, their struggle is based on trying to elevate different heirs to the throne. Primary sources indicate that Siroe (Kavadh II) was the eldest son of Khosrau and not a son of Shirin. Various accounts have Maria as his mother, with Shirin supporting her own son, Mardanshah.

Baum considers Shirin to be a historic figure, Maria being a figure of legend, perhaps originating with a historical Maria from the Byzantine Empire, one who was a member of Khosrau II's harem but neither a queen, nor an imperial princess.

== See also ==
- Women in the Byzantine Empire

== Sources ==
- Baum, Wilhelm (2004). Christian, queen, myth of love, a woman of late antiquity, historical reality and literary effect. Gorgias Press LLC. ISBN 1-59333-282-3.
