= Şəhriyar, Nakhchivan =

Şəhriyar, Nakhchivan may refer to:

- Şəhriyar, Ordubad
- Şəhriyar, Sharur
