= Əminli =

- Municipality
- Location within Azerbaijan
- Coordinates: 39°06′03″N 48°46′08″E
- Country: Azerbaijan
- Rayon: Masally

Population
  - Total: 923
- Time zone: UTC+4 (AZT)
  - Summer (DST): UTC+5 (AZT)

Əminli (also, Eminli, Aminli, and Emenny) is a village and municipality in the Masally Rayon of Azerbaijan. It has a population of 923. The municipality consists of the villages of Əminli and Şəhriyar.
