= Behistun Palace =

Ruined Sassanid palace in Bisotun, Iran

Coordinates: 34°23′18″N 47°26′12″E

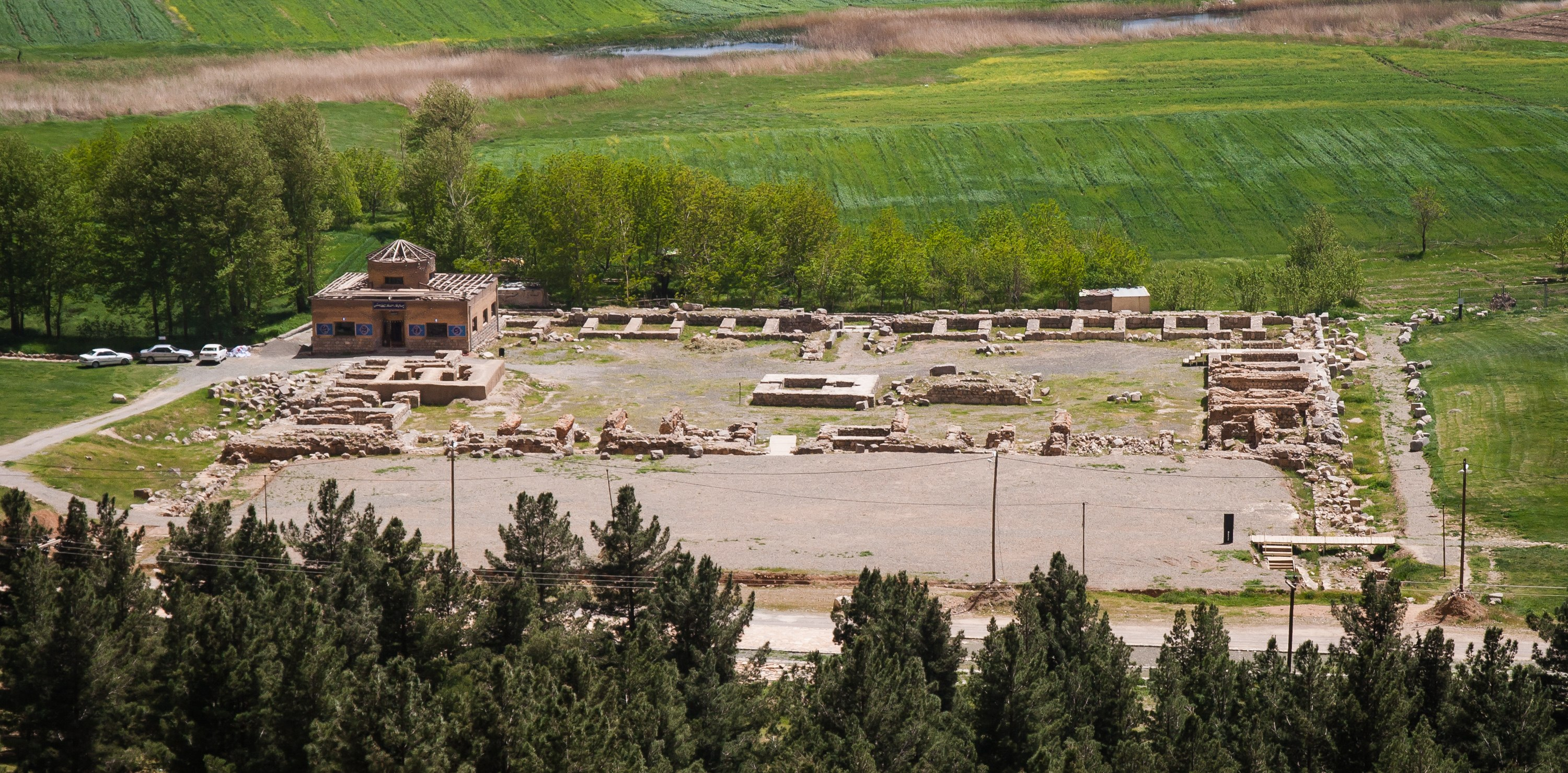
A view of the Palace

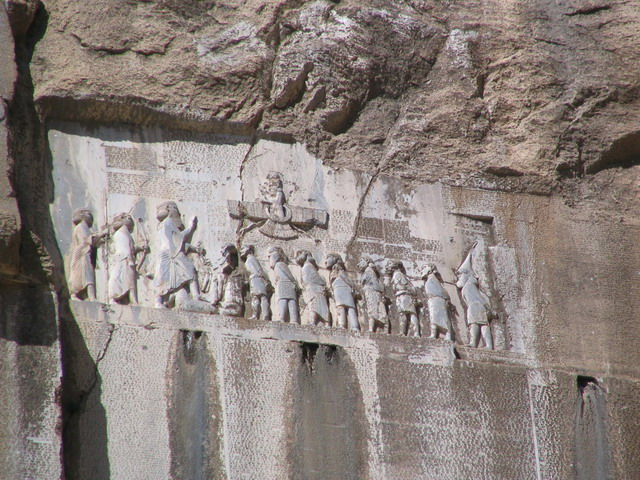
A Picture of Biston inscription

Behistun palace is a ruined Sassanid palace located in Bisotun, 20 kilometres (12 mi) from Kermanshah, Iran. It faces the cliff with the much older Behistun inscription and rock relief, across the ancient road running between Behistun mountain and Behistun lake. The palace has long been regarded in Persian tradition as a residence of Shirin, queen of Khosrau II, the Sassanid Shah of Persia who reigned from 590 to 628, shortly before the Muslim conquest of Persia. This connection is first documented, in surviving records, by early Islamic geographers, and is elaborated in various later stories and myths, as a fictionalized Shirin became an important heroine of later Persian literature, such as the Shahnameh ("Book of Kings"). It is included in the UNESCO World Heritage Site of Bisotun.

== See also ==
- Behistun Inscription
- Darius I of Persia
- Taq-e Bostan (Rock reliefs of various Sassanid kings)
- Achaemenid empire
- Iran National Heritage List
