= Khosrow II =

Emperor of the Sasanian Empire from 590 to 628

Khosrow II 𐭧𐭥𐭮𐭫𐭥𐭣𐭩
- King of Kings of Iranians and non-Iranians
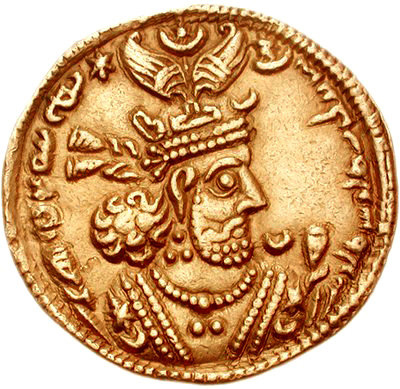
- Gold dinar of Khosrow II, minted in 611

Shahanshah of the Sasanian Empire
- 1st reign: 590
- Predecessor: Hormizd IV
- Successor: Bahram Chobin
- 2nd reign: 591 – 25 February 628
- Predecessor: Bahram Chobin
- Successor: Kavad II
- Rival: Vistahm (590/1–596 or 594/5–600)
- Born: c. 570
- Died: 28 February 628 (aged 57–58); Ctesiphon
- Consort: Maria; Gordiya; Shirin
- Issue: See below
- House: House of Sasan
- Father: Hormizd IV
- Mother: Unnamed Ispahbudhan noblewoman
- Religion: Zoroastrianism

Khosrow II (spelled Chosroes II in classical sources; Middle Persian: 𐭧𐭥𐭮𐭫𐭥𐭣𐭩, romanized: Xusrōγ/Xusrōw and Khosrau), commonly known as Khosrow Parviz (New Persian خسرو پرویز, "Khosrow the Victorious"), is considered to be the last great monarch of pre-Islamic Iran, ruling the Sasanian Empire from 590 to 628, including an interruption of one year.

Khosrow II was the son of Hormizd IV (reigned 579–590), and the grandson of Khosrow I (reigned 531–579). He was the last emperor of Iran to have a lengthy reign before the Muslim conquest of Iran, which began five years after his execution. He lost his throne, then regained it with the help of the Eastern Roman emperor Maurice, and, a decade later, went on to emulate the feats of the Achaemenids, conquering the rich Roman provinces of the Middle East; much of his reign was spent in wars with the Eastern Roman Empire and struggling against usurpers such as Bahram Chobin and Vistahm.

Khosrow II began a war against the Eastern Roman Empire in 602, allegedly to avenge the murder of his ally, Maurice. Persian forces captured much of the Roman territory, earning Khosrow II the epithet "the Victorious". The Siege of Constantinople (626) was unsuccessful, and Heraclius, now allied with Turks, started a risky but successful counterattack deep into the Persian heartland. Dissatisfied with the war, the empire's feudal families supported a coup in which Khosrow II was deposed and killed by his estranged son Sheroe, who took power as Kavad II. This led to a civil war and interregnum in the empire and the reversal of all Sasanian gains in the war against the Romans.

In works of Persian literature such as Ferdowsi's Shahnameh and Nizami Ganjavi's (1141–1209) Khosrow and Shirin, a famous tragic romance and a highly elaborated fictional version of Khosrow's life made him one of the greatest heroes of the culture, as much a lover as a monarch. Khosrow and Shirin tells the story of his love for the originally Aramean princess Shirin, who becomes his queen after a lengthy courtship strewn with mishaps and difficulties.

== Name ==
Khosrow is the New Persian variant of his name used by scholars; in Middle Persian, his name is Husraw, which derives from Avestan Haosrauuah ("he who has good fame"). The name is rendered in Greek as Chosroes (Χοσρόης) and in Arabic as Kisra. He was given the epithet Abarwēz (New Persian Parwēz / Parviz), meaning "victorious." His name in combination with the epithet Abarwēz is attested in Georgian as K‛asre Ambarvez (Juansher Juansheriani, writing around the year 800) and in Armenian as Aprouēz Xosrov.

== Background ==
Khosrow II was born in c. 570; he was the son of Hormizd IV and an unnamed noblewoman from the House of Ispahbudhan, one of the Seven Great Houses of Iran. Her brothers, Vinduyih and Vistahm, were to have a profound influence on Khosrow II's early life. Khosrow's paternal grandfather was the famed emperor Khosrow I (r. 531–579), whilst his paternal grandmother was the daughter of the khagan of the Khazars. Khosrow is first mentioned in the 580s, when he was at Partaw, the capital of Caucasian Albania. During his stay there, he served as its governor and managed to end the Kingdom of Iberia and turn it into a Sasanian province. Furthermore, Khosrow II also served as the governor of Arbela in Upper Mesopotamia sometime before his accession to the throne.

== Rebellion of Bahram Chobin ==
=== Overthrow of Hormizd IV and accession ===
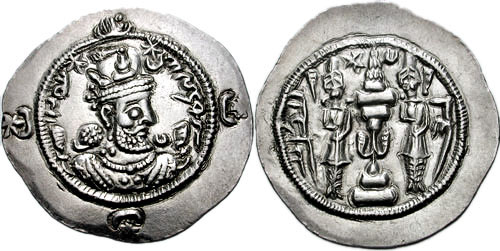
Drachma of Hormizd IV

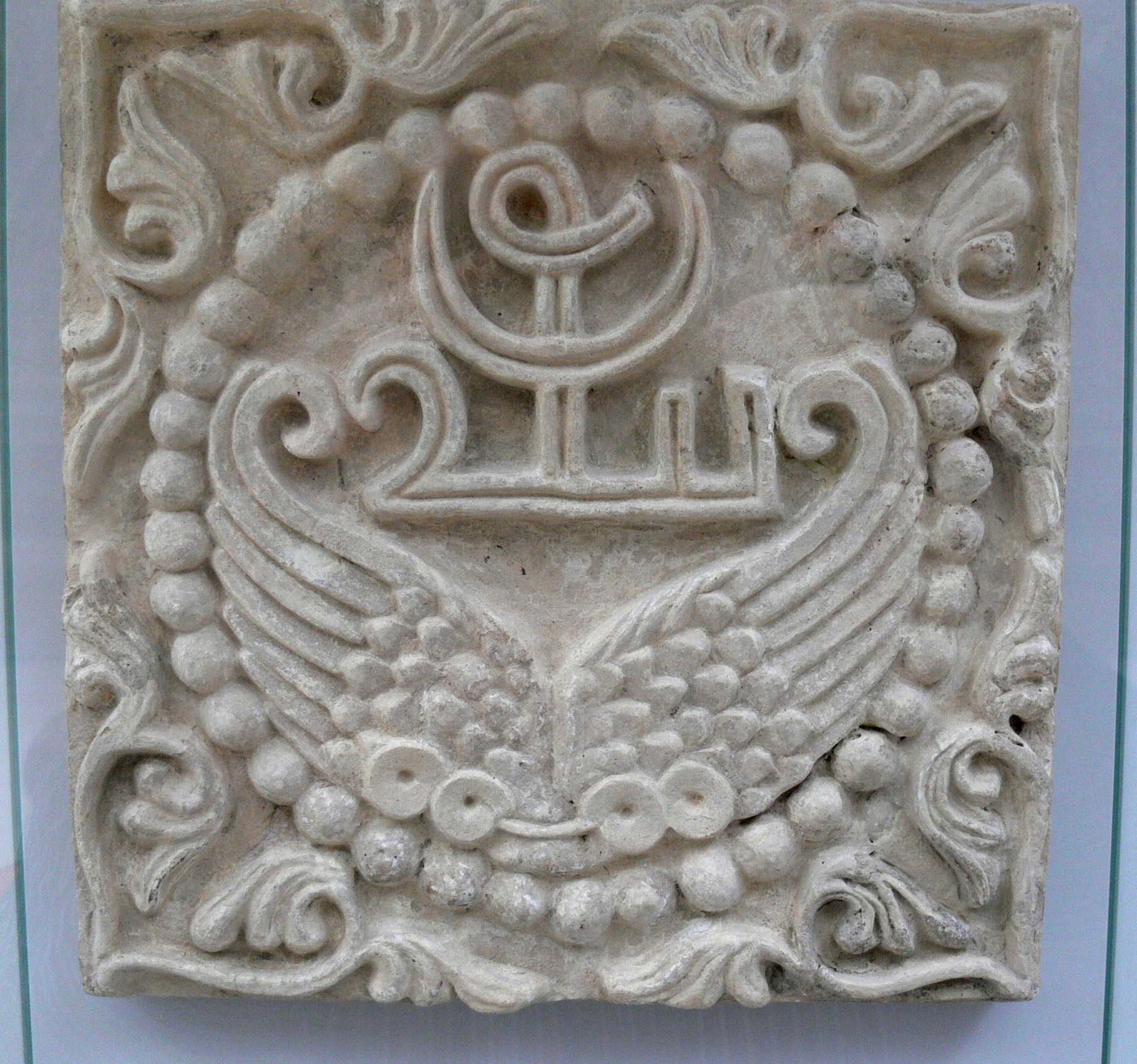
Relief from the Sasanian Empire with the word farr written in a calligraphic style of Middle Persian

In 590, Hormizd IV had his prominent general Bahram Chobin disgraced and dismissed. Bahram, infuriated by Hormizd's actions, responded by rebelling, and due to his noble status and great military knowledge, was joined by his soldiers and many others. He then appointed a new governor for Khorasan, and afterwards set out for the Sasanian capital of Ctesiphon. The legitimacy of the House of Sasan was based on acceptance that the halo of kingship, the farr, was given to the first Sasanian emperor, Ardashir I (r. 224–242) and his family following the latter's conquest of the Parthian Empire. This was now, however, disputed by Bahram Chobin, thus marking the first time in Sasanian history that a Parthian dynast challenged the legitimacy of the Sasanian family by rebelling.

Meanwhile, Hormizd tried to come to terms with his brothers-in-law Vistahm and Vinduyih, who, according to the Syriac language writer Joshua the Stylite, both "equally hated Hormizd". The two brothers overthrew Hormizd in a seemingly bloodless palace revolution. They had Hormizd blinded with a red-hot needle, and put Khosrow II on the throne. Sometime in the summer of 590, the two brothers then had Hormizd killed, with at least the implicit approval of Khosrow II. Nevertheless, Bahram Chobin continued his march to Ctesiphon, now with the pretext of claiming to avenge Hormizd.

Khosrow then took a carrot and stick attitude, and wrote a message to Bahram Chobin, stressing his rightful claim to the Sasanian kingship: "Khosrow, king of kings, ruler over the ruling, lord of the peoples, prince of peace, salvation of men, among gods the good and eternally living man, among men the most esteemed god, the highly illustrious, the victor, the one who rises with the sun and who lends the night his eyesight, the one famed through his ancestors, the king who hates, the benefactor who engaged the Sasanians and saved the Iranians their kingship—to Bahram, the general of the Iranians, our friend.... We have also taken over the royal throne in a lawful manner and have upset no Iranian customs.... We have so firmly decided not to take off the diadem that we even expected to rule over other worlds, if this were possible.... If you wish your welfare, think about what is to be done."

=== Flight ===
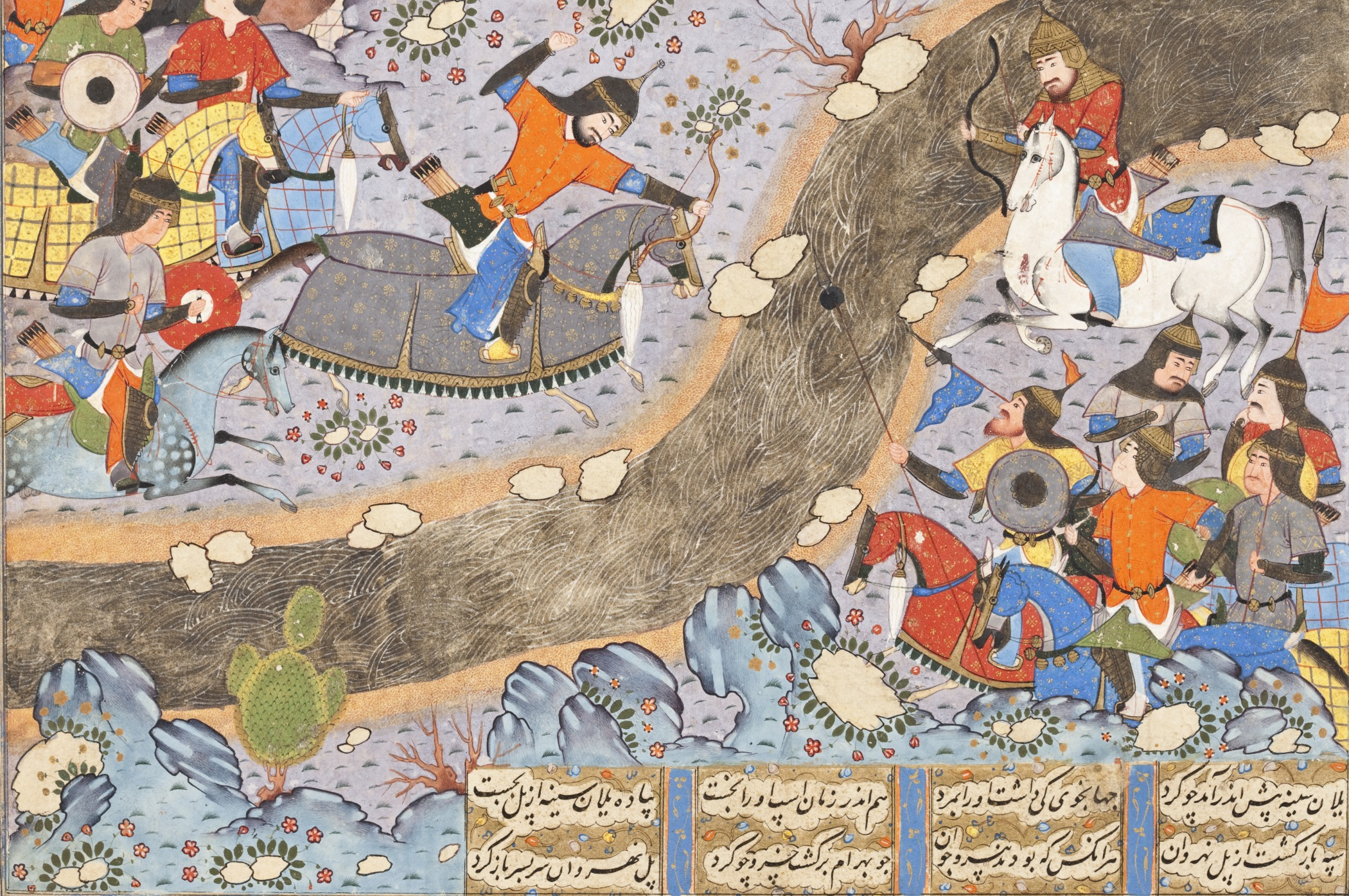
Bahram Chobin fighting Sasanian loyalists near Ctesiphon

Bahram Chobin, however, ignored his warning—a few days later, he reached the Nahrawan Canal near Ctesiphon, where he fought Khosrow's men, who were heavily outnumbered, but managed to hold Bahram Chobin's men back in several clashes. However, Khosrow's men eventually began losing their morale, and were in the end defeated by Bahram Chobin's forces. Khosrow, together with his two uncles, his wives, and a retinue of 30 nobles, thereafter fled to Byzantine territory, while Ctesiphon fell to Bahram Chobin. Bahram Chobin declared himself king of kings in the summer of 590, asserting that the first Sasanian king Ardashir I (r. 224–242) had usurped the throne of the Arsacids, and that he now was restoring their rule.

Bahram Chobin tried to support his cause with the Zoroastrian apocalyptic belief that by the end of Zoroaster's millennium, chaos and destructive wars with the Hephthalites/Huns and the Romans occur, and then a saviour would appear. Indeed, the Sasanians had misidentified Zoroaster's era with that of the Seleucid Empire (312 BCE), which put Bahram Chobin's life almost at the end of Zoroaster's millennium, he was therefore hailed by many as the promised savior, Kay Bahram Varjavand. Bahram was to re-establish the Parthian Empire and commenced a new millennium of dynastic rule. He started minting coins, on the front of which he is depicted as an exalted figure, bearded and wearing a crenellation-shaped crown with two crescents of the moon, whilst the reverse shows the traditional fire altar flanked by two attendants. Regardless, many nobles and priests still chose to side with the inexperienced and less dominant Khosrow II.

In order to get the attention of the Byzantine emperor Maurice (r. 582–602), Khosrow II went to Roman Syria, and sent a message to the Sasanian occupied city of Martyropolis to stop their resistance against the Byzantines, but to no avail. He then sent a message to Maurice, and requested his help to regain the Sasanian throne, which the Byzantine emperor agreed with; in return, the Byzantines would re-gain sovereignty over the cities of Amida, Carrhae, Dara and Martyropolis. Furthermore, Iran was required to stop intervening in the affairs of the Kingdom of Iberia and Armenia, effectively ceding control of Lazistan to the Byzantines.

=== Return to Iran ===
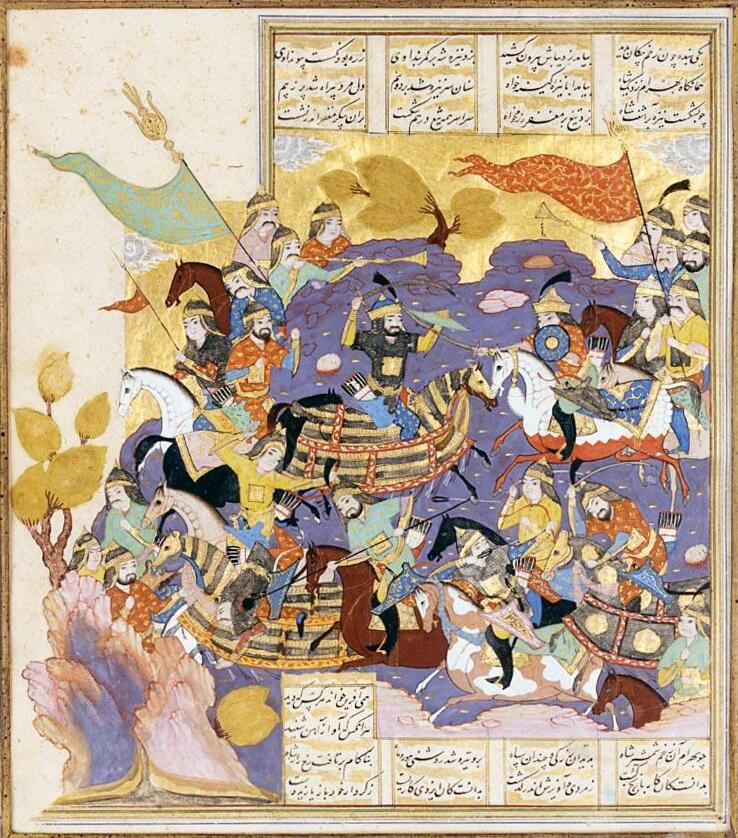
Illustration of the forces of Bahram Chobin and Khosrow II fighting.

In 591, Khosrow moved to Constantia and prepared to invade Bahram Chobin's territories in Mesopotamia, while Vistahm and Vinduyih were raising an army in Adurbadagan under the observation of the Byzantine commander John Mystacon, who was also raising an army in Armenia. After some time, Khosrow, along with the Byzantine commander of the south, Comentiolus, invaded Mesopotamia. During this invasion, Nisibis and Martyropolis quickly defected to them, and Bahram Chobin's commander Zatsparham was defeated and killed. One of Bahram Chobin's other commanders, Bryzacius, was captured in Mosul and had his nose and ears cut off, and was thereafter sent to Khosrow, where he was killed. Khosrow II and the Byzantine general Narses then penetrated deeper into Bahram's territory, seizing Dara and then Mardin in February, where Khosrow was re-proclaimed king. Shortly after this, Khosrow sent one of his Iranian supporters, Mahbodh, to capture Ctesiphon, which he managed to accomplish.

Map of the Roman-Sasanian frontier during late antiquity, including the 591 border that was established between the two empires after Khosrow II's victory over Bahram Chobin.

At the same time a force of 8,000 Iranians under Vistahm and Vinduyih and 12,000 Armenians under Mushegh II Mamikonian invaded Adurbadagan. Bahram Chobin tried to disrupt the force by writing a letter to Mushegh II, the letter said: "As for you Armenians who demonstrate an unseasonable loyalty, did not the house of Sasan destroy your land and sovereignty? Why otherwise did your fathers rebel and extricate themselves from their service, fighting up until today for your country?" Bahram Chobin in his letter promised that the Armenians would become partners of the new Iranian empire ruled by a Parthian dynastic family if he accepted his proposal to betray Khosrow II. Mushegh, however, rejected the offer.

Bahram Chobin was then defeated at the Battle of Blarathon, forcing him to flee with 4,000 men eastwards. He marched towards Nishapur, where he defeated a pursuing army as well as an army led by a Karenid nobleman at Qumis. Constantly troubled, he crossed the Oxus river, where he was received honorably by the Khagan of the Turks, who was most likely Birmudha—the same Turkic prince that Bahram Chobin had defeated and captured a few years earlier during his wars against the Turks. Bahram Chobin entered his service, and was appointed as a commander in the army, achieving further military accomplishments there. Bahram Chobin became a highly popular figure after saving the Khagan from a conspiracy instigated by the latter's brother Byghu (conceivably an incorrect translation of yabghu). Khosrow II, however, could not feel safe as long as Bahram Chobin lived, and succeeded in having him assassinated. The assassination was reportedly achieved through distribution of presents and bribes between the members of the Turkic royal family, notably the queen. What remained of Bahram Chobin's supporters went back to northern Iran and joined the rebellion of Vistahm (590/1–596 or 594/5–600).

== Consolidation of the empire ==
=== Domestic affairs and relations with the Byzantines ===
With Khosrow's rule now restored, his aim was to consolidate his grip over his realm, which included showing tolerance and support to his Christian subjects. His wife Shirin—a Christian from Khuzestan—was the most influential of his wives, playing an important role in the royal favour that the Mesopotamian Christians enjoyed. She had a church and monastery constructed near the palace in Ctesiphon, which was used to receive a portion of the treasury for the wages of the clergy and their vestments. The Arab Lakhmid kingdom, a client state located at al-Hira and its surroundings, could now openly convert to the Church of the East without angering the Sasanian court.

The Iranians and the Byzantines enjoyed good relations for the first eleven years. This was apparent in their management of the issues that had arisen in Armenia. In the 590s, many Armenian nobles and their supporters sought asylum in Iran to avoid being conscripted for Maurice's Balkan campaigns. The open borders between the two empires meant that nobles could freely immigrate to Iran and get promoted. However, when they showed signs of aspiring to fight the Byzantines, the Iranians worked together with the Byzantines to deal with the issue.

=== Revolt of Vistahm ===
After his victory, Khosrow rewarded his uncles with high positions: Vinduyih became treasurer and first minister and Vistahm received the post of spahbed of the East, encompassing Tabaristan and Khorasan, which was the traditional homeland of the Ispahbudhan. Soon, however, Khosrow changed his intentions: trying to disassociate himself from his father's murder, he decided to execute his uncles. The Sasanian monarchs' traditional mistrust of over-powerful magnates and Khosrow's personal resentment of Vinduyih's patronising manner certainly contributed to this decision. Vinduyih was soon put to death, according to a Syriac source captured while trying to flee to his brother in the East.

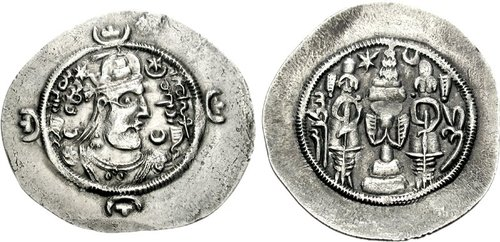
Drachma of Vistahm, minted at Ray

At the news of his brother's murder, Vistahm rose in open revolt. According to Dinawari, Vistahm sent a letter to Khosrow announcing his claim to the throne through his Parthian (Arsacid) heritage: "You are not worthier to rule than I am. Indeed, I am more deserving on account of my descent from Darius, son of Darius, who fought Alexander. You Sasanians deceitfully gained superiority over us [the Arsacids] and usurped our right, and treated us with injustice. Your ancestor Sasan was no more than a shepherd." Vistahm's revolt, like Bahrams's shortly before, found support and spread quickly. Local magnates as well as the remnants of Bahram Chobin's armies flocked to him, especially after he married Bahram's sister Gordiya. Vistahm repelled several loyalist efforts to subdue him, and he soon held sway in the entire eastern and northern quadrants of the Iranian realm, a domain stretching from the Oxus river to the region of Ardabil in the west. He even campaigned in the east, where he subdued two Hephthalite princes of Transoxiana, Shaug and Pariowk. The date of Vistahm's uprising is uncertain. From his coinage, it is known that his rebellion lasted for seven years. The commonly accepted dates are ca. 590–596, but some scholars like J. D. Howard-Johnston and Parvaneh Pourshariati push its outbreak later, in 594/5, to coincide with the Armenian Vahewuni rebellion.

As Vistahm began to threaten Media, Khosrow sent several armies against his uncle, but failed to achieve a decisive result: Vistahm and his followers retreated to the mountainous region of Gilan, while several Armenian contingents of the royal army rebelled and defected to Vistahm. Finally, Khosrow called upon the services of the Armenian Smbat Bagratuni, who engaged Vistahm near Qumis. During the battle, Vistahm was murdered by Pariowk at Khosrow's urging (or, according to an alternative account, by his wife Gordiya). Nevertheless, Vistahm's troops managed to repel the royal army at Qumis, and it required another expedition by Smbat the following year to finally end the rebellion.

=== Abolition of the Lakhmid dynasty ===
In 600, Khosrow II executed Al-Nu'man III ibn al-Mundhir, the Lakhmid king of al-Hira, presumably because of his refusal to give him his daughter, al-Ḥurqah, in marriage and his insults of Persian women. Afterwards, the central government took over the defence of the western frontiers to the desert, and the buffer state of the Lakhmids vanished. This ultimately facilitated the Arab conquest of Mesopotamia less than a decade after Khosrow's death.

== Byzantine–Sasanian War of 602–628 ==
=== Initial Iranian invasion and dominance ===
Sasanian territories in 620s

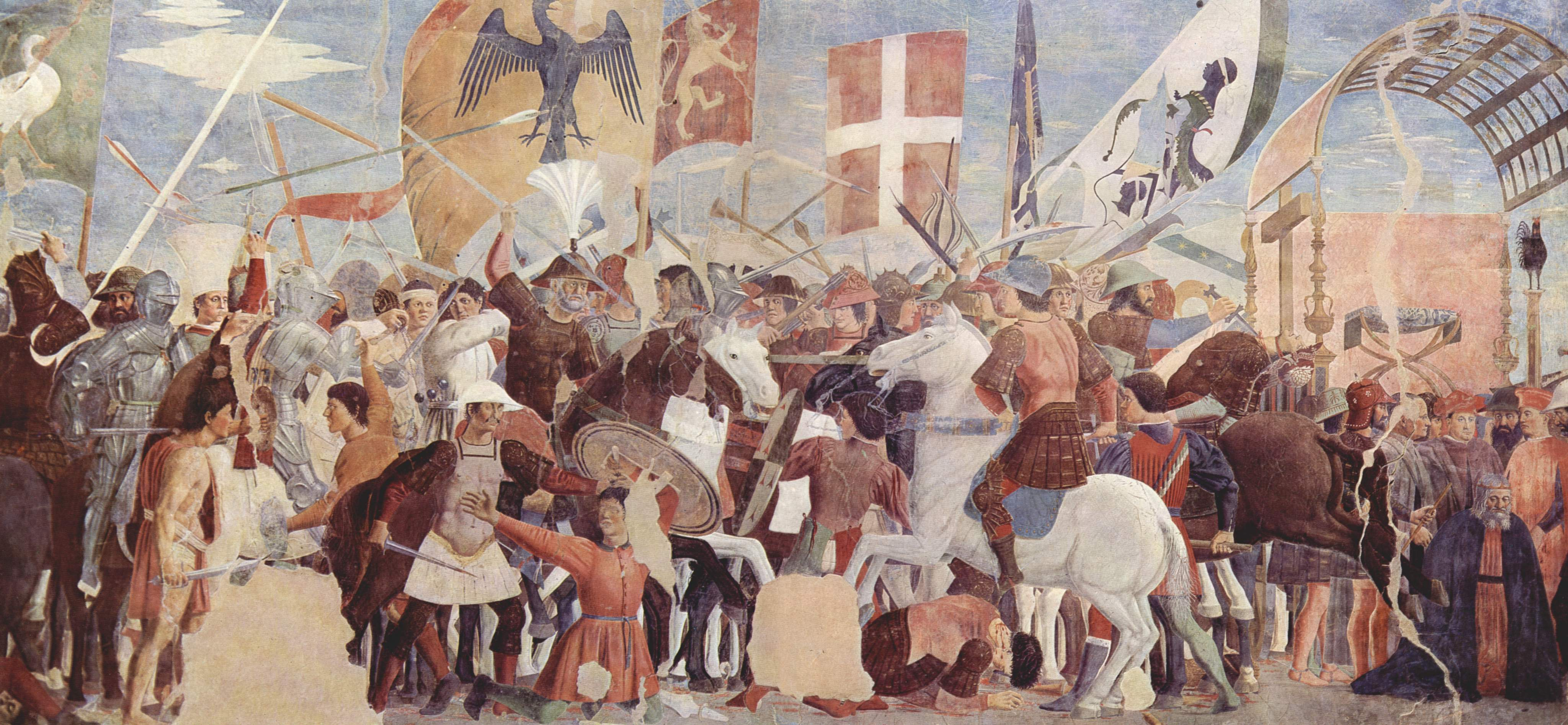
An anachronistic illustration of the Battle of Nineveh (627) between Heraclius' army and the Persians under Khosrow II. Fresco by Piero della Francesca, ca. 1452

Toward the beginning of his reign, Khosrow II had good relations with the Byzantines. However, when in 602 Emperor Maurice was murdered by his General Phocas (602–610), who usurped the Roman (Byzantine) throne, Khosrow launched an offensive against Constantinople: ostensibly to avenge Maurice's death, but his aim clearly included the annexation of as much Byzantine territory as was feasible. In 604 or 605, Khosrow personally led the Sasanians in a decisive victory over the Byzantines at the battle of Arzamon, which opened upper Mesopotamia to further attack. With Byzantine power crippled, Sasanian forces were able to capture Dara and Edessa in 605, and recaptured lost territory in the north, which made the Sasanian–Byzantine borders go back to the pre-591 frontier before Khosrow gave Maurice territory in return for military aid against Bahram Chobin. After having reclaimed lost territory, Khosrow withdrew from the battlefield and handed military operations to Shahrbaraz and Shahin Vahmanzadegan. The Sasanian armies then invaded and plundered Syria and Asia Minor, and in 608 advanced into Chalcedon.

In 610, Heraclius revolted against Phocas and killed him, crowning himself as Emperor of the Byzantine Empire. He then tried to negotiate peace with Khosrow II by sending diplomats to his court. Khosrow, however, rejected their offer and said: "That kingdom belongs to me, and I shall enthrone Maurice's son, Theodosius, as emperor. [As for Heraclius], he went and took the rule without our order and now offers us our own treasure as gifts. But I shall not stop until I have him in my hands." Khosrow then had the diplomats executed.

In 613 and 614, General Shahrbaraz besieged and captured Damascus and Jerusalem, and the True Cross was carried away in triumph. Soon afterwards, Shahin marched through Anatolia, defeating the Byzantines numerous times; he conquered Egypt in 618. The Byzantines could offer but little resistance, as they were torn apart by internal dissensions, and pressed by the Avars and Slavs, who were invading the Empire from across the Danube River. In 622/3, Rhodes and several other islands in the eastern Aegean fell to the Sasanians, threatening a naval assault on Constantinople. Such was the despair in Constantinople that Heraclius considered moving the government to Carthage in Africa.

=== Turko-Hephthalite invasion ===
In ca. 606/607, Khosrow recalled Smbat IV Bagratuni from Sasanian Armenia and sent him to repel the Turko-Hephthalites, who had raided as far as Spahan in central Iran. Smbat, with the aid of an Iranian prince named Datoyean, repelled the Turko-Hephthalites from Iran, and plundered their domains in eastern Khorasan, where Smbat is said to have killed their king in single combat. Khosrow then gave Smbat the honorific title Khosrow Shun ("the Joy or Satisfaction of Khosrow"), while his son Varaztirots II Bagratuni received the honorific name Javitean Khosrow ("Eternal Khosrow").

Sebeos describes the event as:

He [Khosrow] ordered that a huge elephant be adorned and brought to the chamber. He commanded that [Smbat's son] Varaztirots' (who was called Javitean Khosrow by the king), be seated atop [the elephant]. And he ordered treasures scattered on the crowd. He wrote [to Smbat] a hrovartak [expressing] great satisfaction and summoned him to court with great honor and pomp. [Smbat] died in the 28th year of [Khosrow's] reign [618–19].

=== Byzantine counter-offensive and resurgence ===
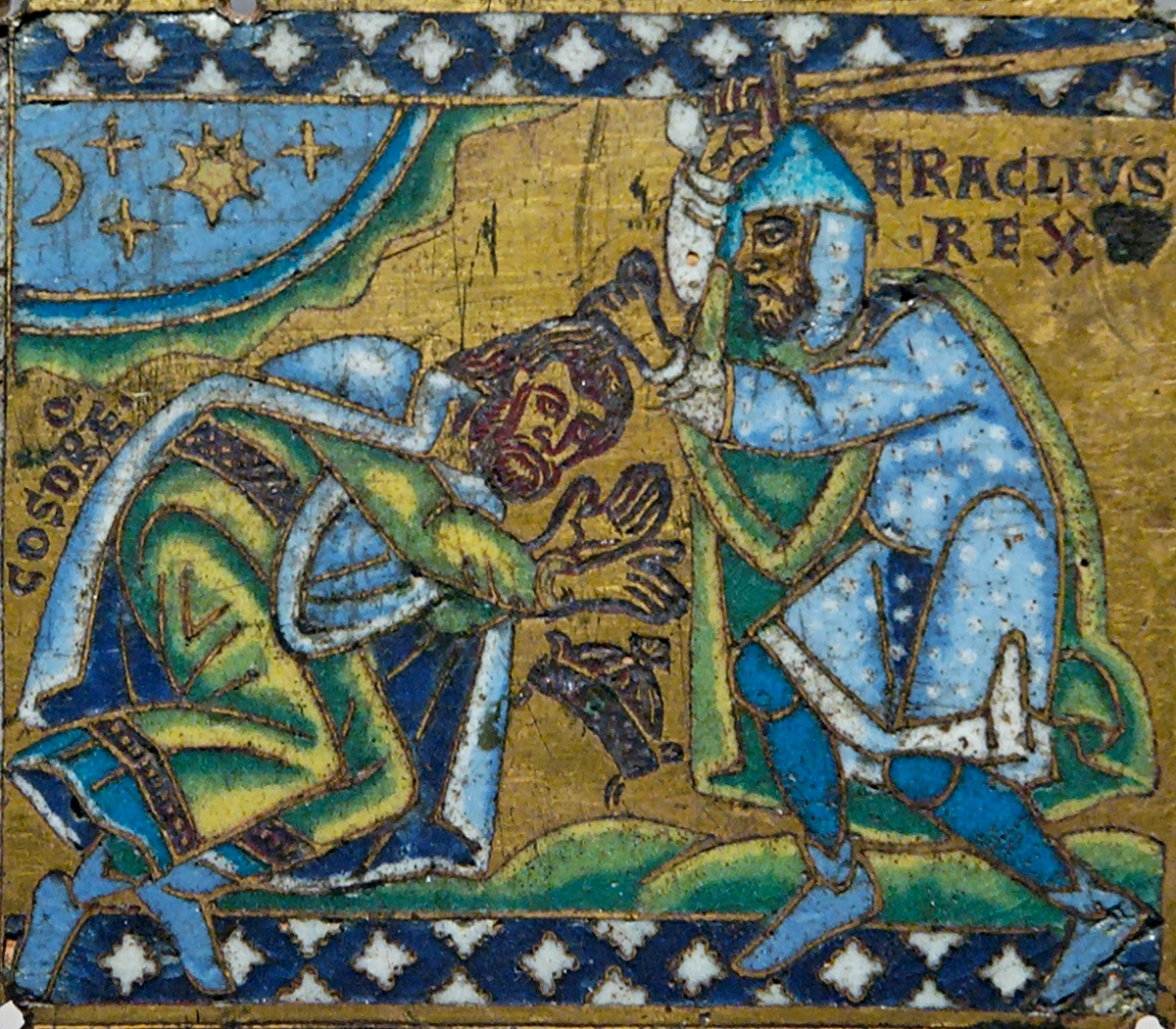
Sassanid King Khosrow II being vanquished by the Byzantine Emperor Heraclius, from a plaque on a 12th-century French cross. This is only allegorical, as Khosrow II never actually submitted in person to Heraclius.

In 622, despite the major progress the Sasanians were making in the area of the Aegean Sea, the Byzantine Emperor Heraclius was able to take the field with a powerful force. In 624, he advanced into northern Adurbadagan, where he was welcomed by Farrukh Hormizd and his son Rostam Farrokhzad who had rebelled against Khosrow. Heraclius then began sacking several cities and temples, including the Adur Gushnasp temple.

In 626 Heraclius captured Lazistan (Colchis). Later that same year, Shahrbaraz advanced on Chalcedon on the Bosphoros and attempted to capture Constantinople with the help of Avar and Slavic allies. In this siege of Constantinople in 626, the combined Sassanid, Slavic and Avar forces failed to capture the Byzantine capital city. The Avars did not have the patience or technology to conquer the city. On top of that, the Iranians, who were siege warfare experts, were unable to transport their troops and equipment to the other side of the Bosphorus where their Slavic and Avar allies were located, due to heavy guarding of the strait by the Byzantine navy. Furthermore, the walls of Constantinople were easily defended against the siege towers and engines. Another reason was that the Persians and Slavs did not have a strong enough navy to skirt the sea walls and establish a channel of communication. The lack of supplies for the Avars eventually caused them to abandon the siege. As this maneuver failed, Shahrbaraz' forces were defeated, and he withdrew his army from Anatolia later in 628. Another of Khosrow's armies led by Shahin had been severely defeated by the Byzantines in Anatolia at the Battle of the Lycus.

During the Perso-Turkic war of 627–629, Heraclius defeated the Sasanian army at the Battle of Nineveh (627) and advanced towards Ctesiphon. Khosrow II fled from his favorite residence, Dastagird, which was nearby, without offering resistance. Heraclius then captured Dastagird and plundered it.

== Overthrow and death ==
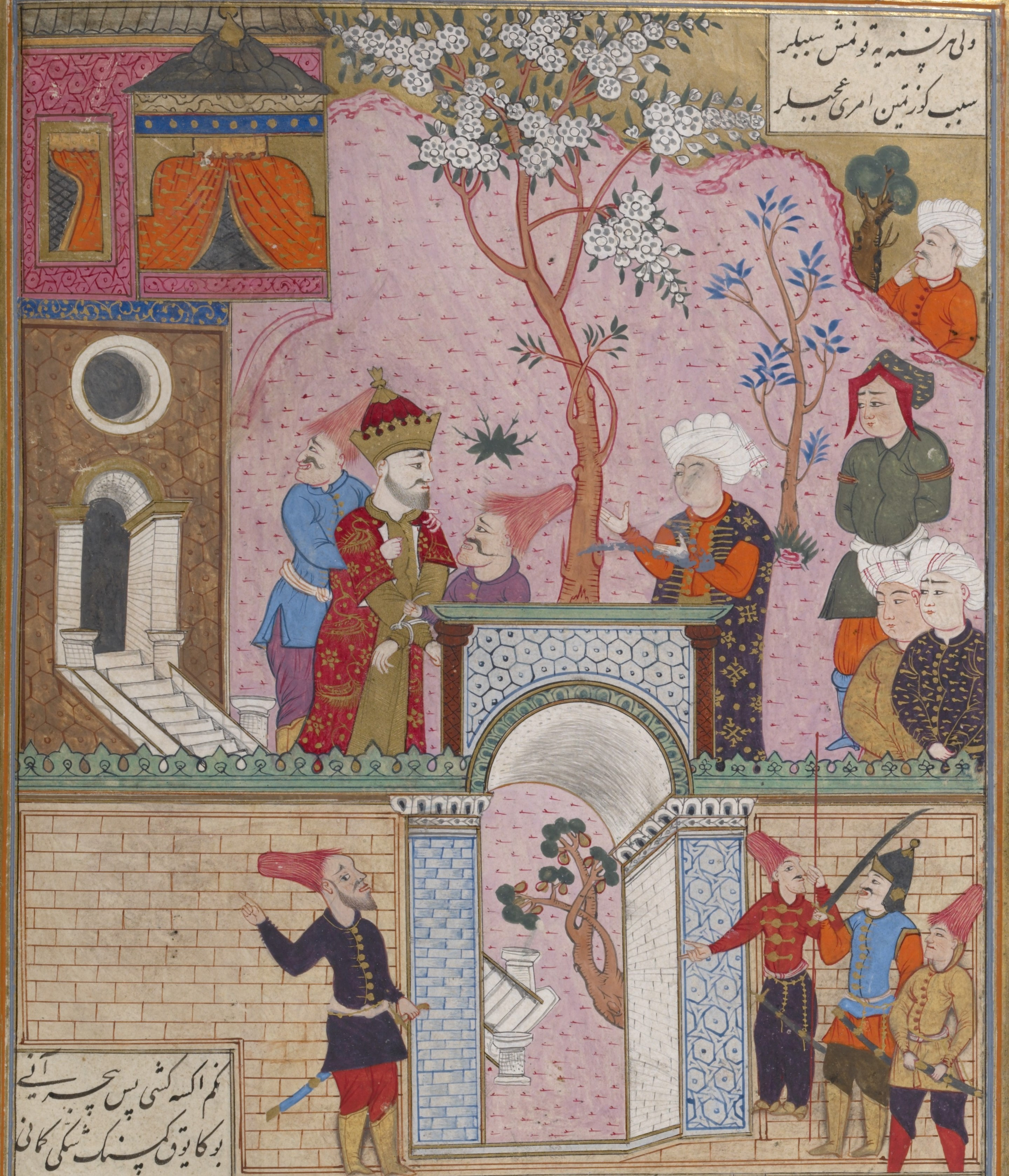
17th-century Shahnameh illustration of Khosrow II's arrest

After the capture of Dastagird, the son of Khosrow, Sheroe, was released by the feudal families of the Sasanian Empire, which included the Ispahbudhan spahbed Farrukh Hormizd and his two sons Rostam Farrokhzad and Farrukhzad. Shahrbaraz of the Mihran family, the Armenian faction represented by Varaztirots II Bagratuni, and finally Kanadbak of the Kanārangīyān family. On the night of 25 February, the night-watch of the Sasanian capital of Ctesiphon, which would usually shout the name of the reigning emperor, shouted the name of Sheroe instead, which indicated a coup d'état was taking place. Sheroe, with Aspad Gushnasp leading his army, captured Ctesiphon and imprisoned Khosrow II in the house of a certain Mehr-Sepand (also known as Maraspand). Sheroe, who had now assumed the dynastic name of Kavad II, then ordered Aspad Gushnasp to lead the charge of accusations against the deposed emperor. Khosrow, however, dismissed all accusations one by one.

Kavad shortly proceeded to have all his brothers and half-brothers executed, including the heir Mardanshah, who was Khosrow's favourite son. The murder of all his brothers, "all well-educated, valiant, and chivalrous men", stripped the Sasanian dynasty of a future competent ruler, and has been described as a "mad rampage" and "reckless". Three days later he ordered Mihr Hormozd to execute Khosrow. However, after the regicide of his father, Kavad also proceeded to have Mihr Hormozd killed. Khosrow's daughters Boran and Azarmidokht reportedly criticized and scolded Kavad for his barbaric actions, which made him filled with remorse. With the support of the Iranian nobles, Kavad then made peace with the Byzantine emperor Heraclius, which made the Byzantines regain all their lost territories, their captured soldiers, a war indemnity, along with the True Cross and other relics that were lost in Jerusalem in 614.

Due to Kavad's actions, his reign is seen as a turning point in Sasanian history, and has been argued by some scholars as playing a key role in the fall of the Sasanian Empire. The overthrow and death of Khosrow culminated in a chaotic civil war, with the most powerful members of the nobility gaining full autonomy and starting to create their own government. The hostilities between the Persian (Parsig) and Parthian (Pahlav) noble-families were also resumed, which split up the wealth of the nation. The civil war finally ended when Khosrow's eight-year-old grandson, Yazdegerd III, ascended the throne. The young emperor, however, inherited a disintegrating empire, which was dealt its last blow in 651 during the Arab conquest of Iran.

== Religious policy and beliefs ==
Khosrow II, like all other Sasanian rulers, was an adherent of Zoroastrianism. Since the 5th century, the Sasanian monarchs had been made aware of the significance of the religious minorities in the realm, and as a result tried to integrate them into a structure of administration where, according to legal principles, all would be treated straightforwardly as mard / zan ī šahr, i.e. "man/woman [citizen] of the country". Jews and Christians (but not the persecuted Manichaeans) had accepted the concept of Eranshahr / Iran (which had once been inextricable from Zoroastrianism) and considered themselves part of it.

During his reign there was constant conflict between Monophysite and Nestorian Christians. Khosrow favored the Monophysites, and ordered all his subjects to adhere to Monophysitism, perhaps under the influence of Shirin and the royal physician Gabriel of Sinjar, who both supported this faith. Khosrow also dispensed money or gifts to Christian shrines. Khosrow's great tolerance to Christianity and friendship with the Christian Byzantines even made some Armenian writers think that Khosrow was a Christian. His positive policy toward Christians (which, however, was probably politically motivated) made him unpopular with the Zoroastrian priests, and also made Christianity greatly spread around the Sasanian Empire. In 591, at the beginning of his reign, Byzantine-Sasanian negotiations resulted in an edict of toleration, based on the understanding that proselytization would be banned. According to Nina Garsoïan, Khosrow "returned to the normal pattern of alternate toleration and repression" of Christians after the death of his ally Maurice in 602. While individual Christians continued to enjoy his favor, a number of prominent Christian officials and prelates were put to death during this period. During Khosrow's war with the Byzantines, Christian elites and organizations were incorporated into the Sasanian system, as part of his attempt to absorb the Byzantine realm into his expanded empire. The condition of the Christian nobility reached its pinnacle under Khosrow. Mushegh II Mamikonian, a prominent Armenian nakharar, is the first and only Christian nobleman that is praised by courtly historiographers, due to his rejection of the enticements of Bahram Chobin. His decision to choose Khosrow over his native Armenia gained him a place in the Shahnameh, the national epic of Iran. Smbat IV Bagratuni likewise led an illustrious career under Khosrow, rising to the office of frontier commander of Gurgan, possibly the most vital and contested area of the Sasanian realm. As a reward for his accomplishments in the east, Smbat was appointed the leader of the military jurisdiction in the Caucasus. Furthermore, his aristocratic house – the Bagratunis – was made the pillar of Sasanian authority in the area.

Khosrow also paid attention to the Zoroastrians, and had various fire temples constructed. However, this did not help the Zoroastrian church, which was in a heavy decline during his reign. According to Richard N. Frye, the Zoroastrian church under Khosrow "was noted for its devotion to luxury more than its devotion to thought."

== Music during the reign of Khosrow II ==
Khosrow II's reign was considered a golden age in music. Before Khosrow II there were many other Sasanian emperors that showed particular interest in music, like Khosrow I, Bahram Gur, and even Ardashir I. Notable musicians during the reign of Khosrow II were Barbad (Khosrow's favorite court musician), Bamshad, Sarkash, and Nagisa.

== Rock reliefs ==
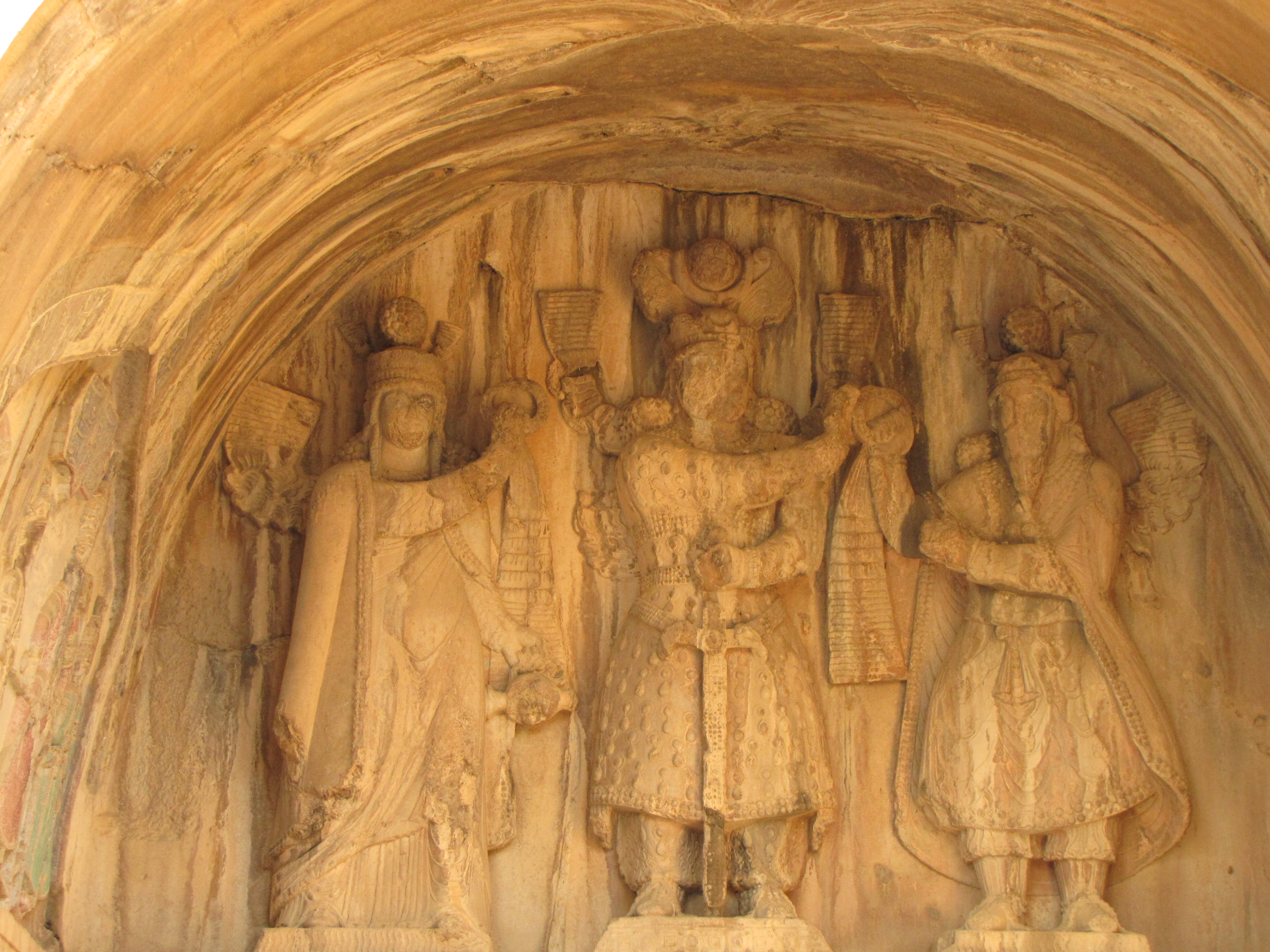
A divine investiture scene, with the Zoroastrian divinities Ahura Mazda and Anahita each giving Khosrow II a diadem.

Khosrow restored the practice of erecting rock reliefs, after an absence of nearly three centuries, the last one being erected under Shapur III (r. 383–388). At Taq-e Bostan, Khosrow mimicked and magnified the rock relief of Shapur III. His relief, known as the "Great Ayvan", is in a barrel vault carved in a cliff. The ayvan is divided into upper and lower sections; the upper section depicts a divine investiture scene, with the Zoroastrian divinities Ahura Mazda and Anahita each bestowing a diadem upon Khosrow. The lower section depicts Khosrow II on horseback, wearing full body armor, whilst holding a lance and shield. His head is encircled by a halo, which according to Howard-Johnston, is most likely a representation of his farr 'imperial glory'. On the left side panel, a boar hunt scene is depicted, portraying Khosrow on a boat whilst aiming a bow. On the right is a deer-hunt scene. The relief, however, is unfinished, probably due to Khosrow's setback in the later stages of the war and his eventual downfall.

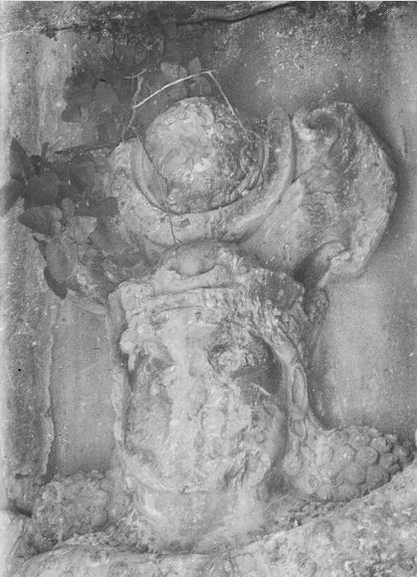
The relief stone of Khosrow II during the coronation

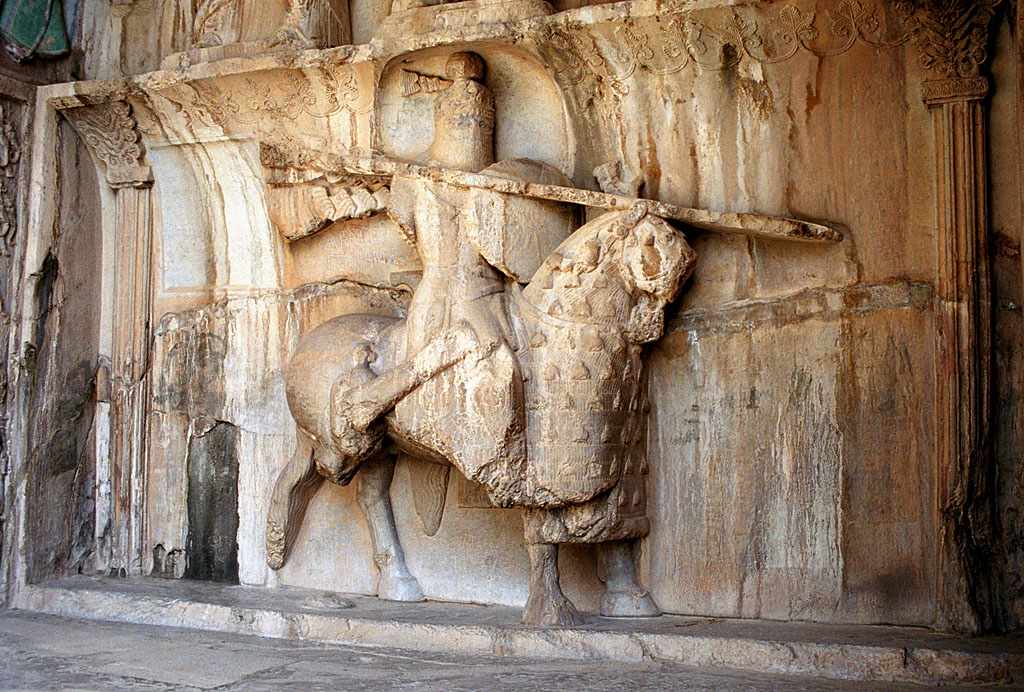
Equestrian statue of Khosrow II.

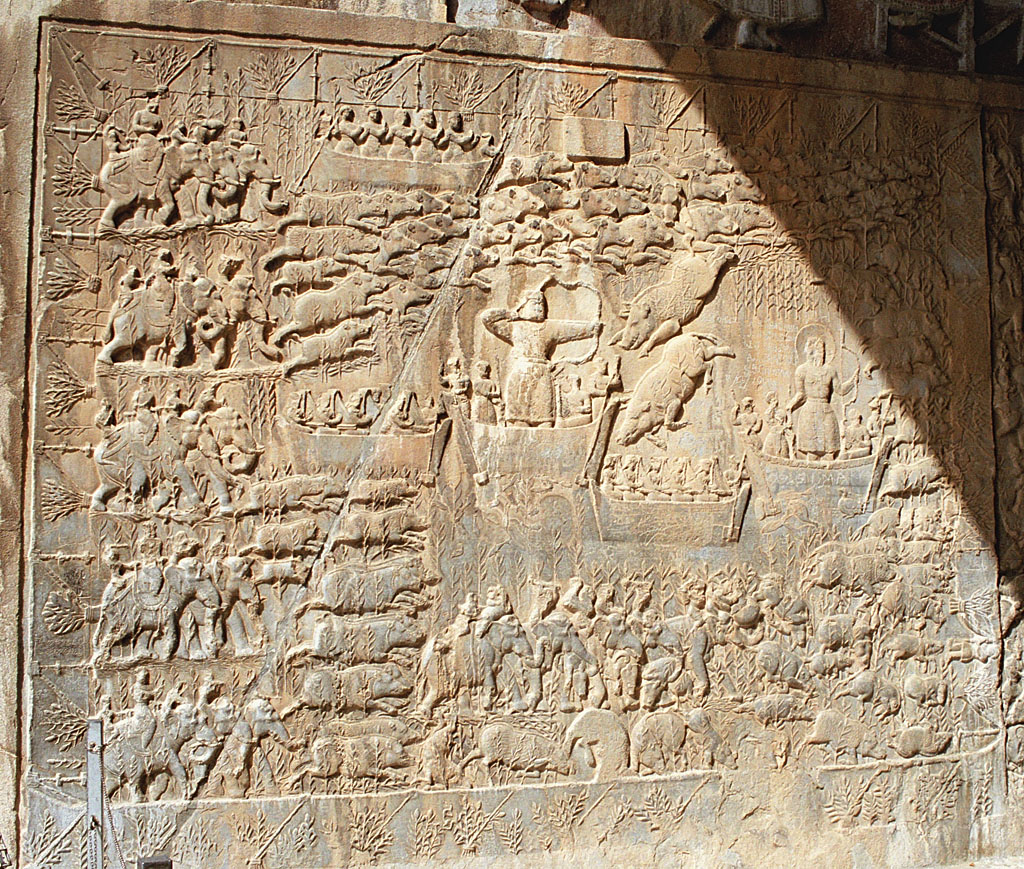
Rock relief on the left side panel, depicting a boar hunt.

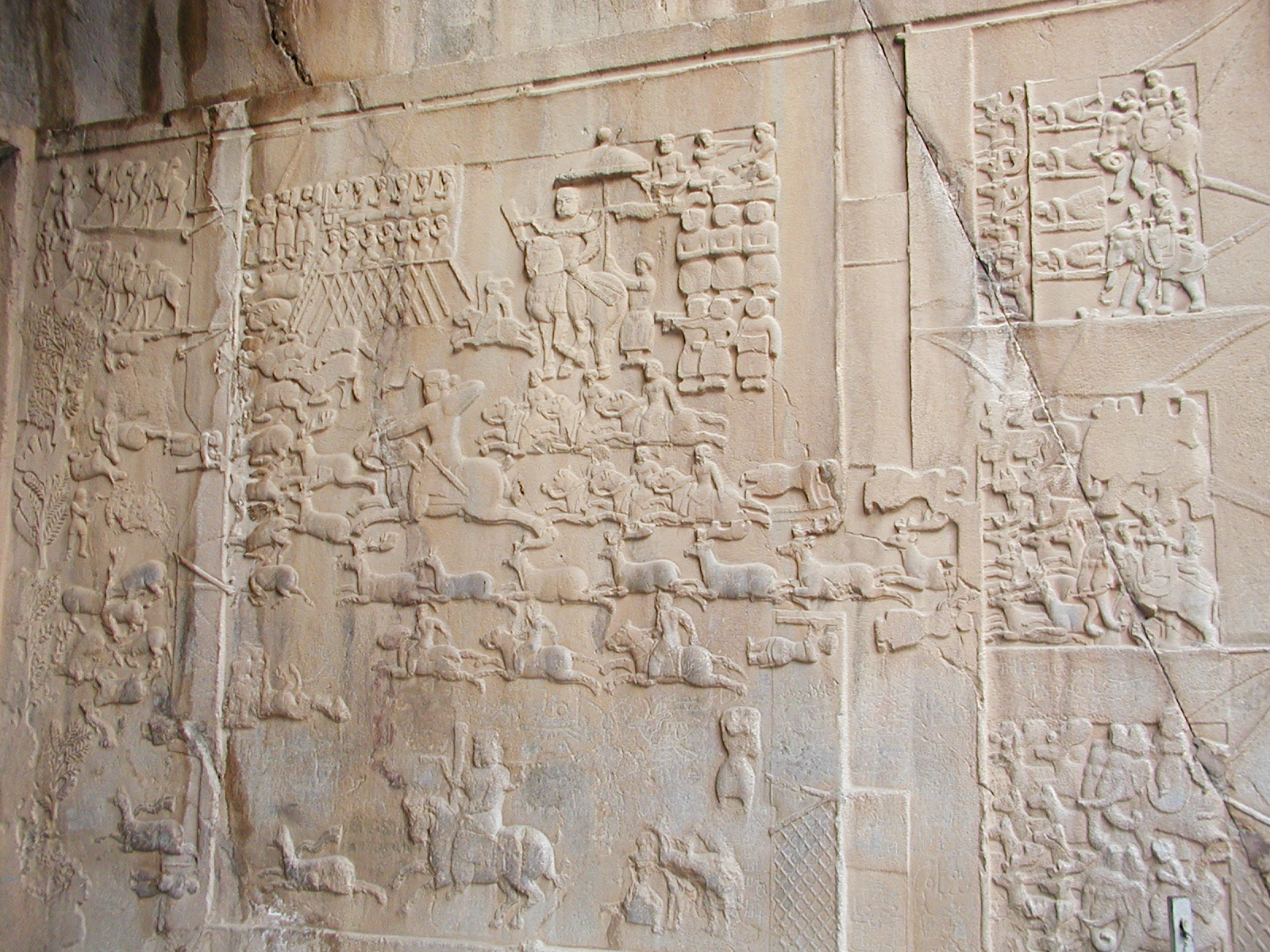
Drawing of an unfinished rock relief on the right side panel, depicting a deer hunt.

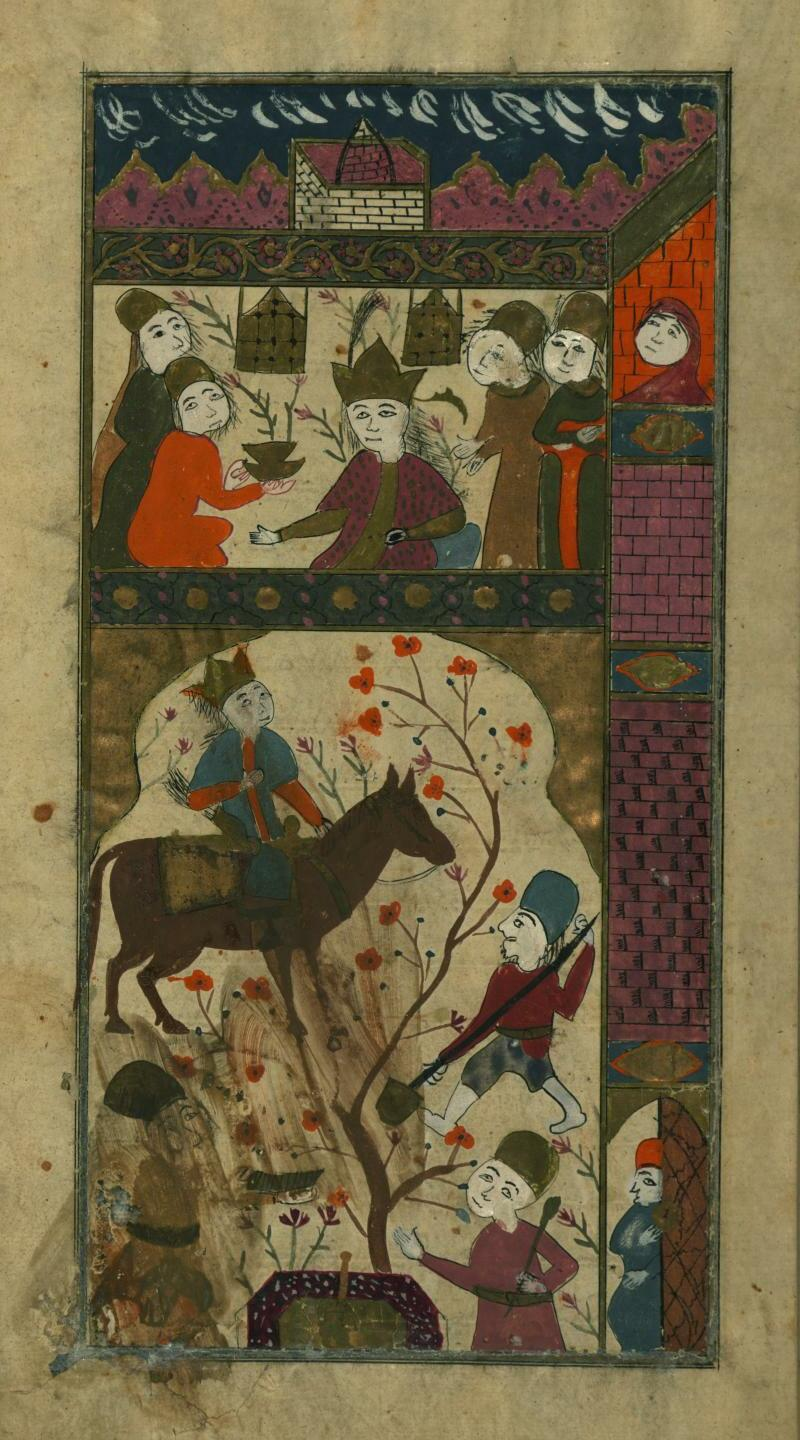
This folio from Walters manuscript W.659 depicts Mount Bistun and the carvings of Khusraw, Shirin, and Farhad.

== Coinage ==
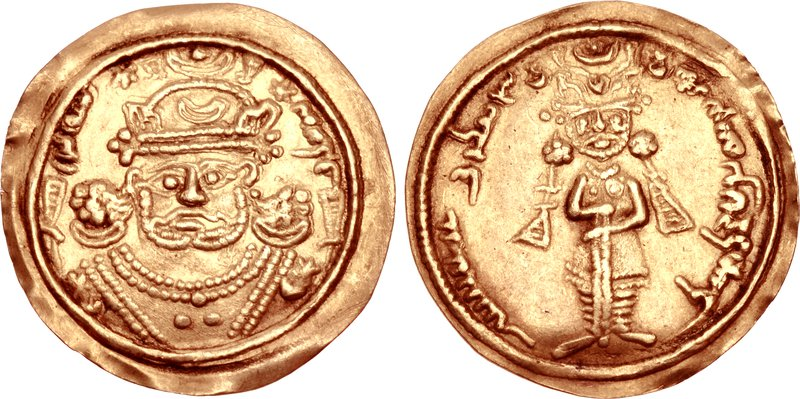
Gold dinar of Khosrow II, minted in 625/6.

Khosrow, during his second reign, added the Aramaic ideogram gdh, read as farr 'royal splendor' on his coins. He combined this together with the word abzōt ("he has increased"), making the full inscription thus read as: "Khosrow, he has increased the royal splendor" (Khūsrōkhwarrah abzōt). The title of King of Kings–missing since the reign of Peroz I (r. 459–484)–was also restored on his coins. According to Shayegan, Khosrow's adoption of the title was "undoubtedly a consequence of his Byzantine policy," and was signifying a resurrection of the ancient Achaemenid Empire. His two successors, Kavad II (r. 628–628) and Ardashir III (r. 628–630), refrained from using the title, seemingly in order distance themselves from him.

== Khosrow II in Islamic tradition ==
It is documented in Islamic tradition and records that Khosrow II (in Arabic: كسرى, romanized: Kisra) was a Persian emperor to whom Muhammad had sent a messenger, Abdullah ibn Hudhafah as-Sahmi, along with a letter in which Khosrow was asked to preach the religion of Islam. The letter as transmitted by Muslim tradition reads:

In the name of Allah, the Beneficent, the Merciful. From Muhammad, the Messenger of Allah, to Kisra, the great (leader/head) of the Persians. Peace be upon him, who seeks truth and expresses belief in Allah and in His Prophet and testifies that there is no god but Allah and that He has no partner, and who believes that Muhammad is His servant and Prophet. Under the Command of Allah, I invite you to Him. He has sent me for the guidance of all people so that I may warn them all of His wrath and may present the unbelievers with an ultimatum. Embrace Islam so that you may remain safe (in this life and the next). And if you refuse to accept Islam, you will be responsible for the sins of the Magi.

Upon receipt, Khosrow II tore up Muhammad's letter saying, "A pitiful slave among my subjects dares write his name before mine" and commanded Badhan, his vassal ruler of Yemen, to dispatch two valiant men to identify, seize and bring this man from Hijaz (Muhammad) to him. When Abdullah ibn Hudhafah as-Sahmi told Muhammad that Khosrow had torn his letter to pieces, Muhammad promised to destroy Khosrow II, stating, "Even so, God shall destroy his kingdom." Badhan received confirmation from Persia that Khosrow II was dead. As a consequence, he is said to have accepted Islam, and Muhammad appointed him ruler over his people.

== In art ==
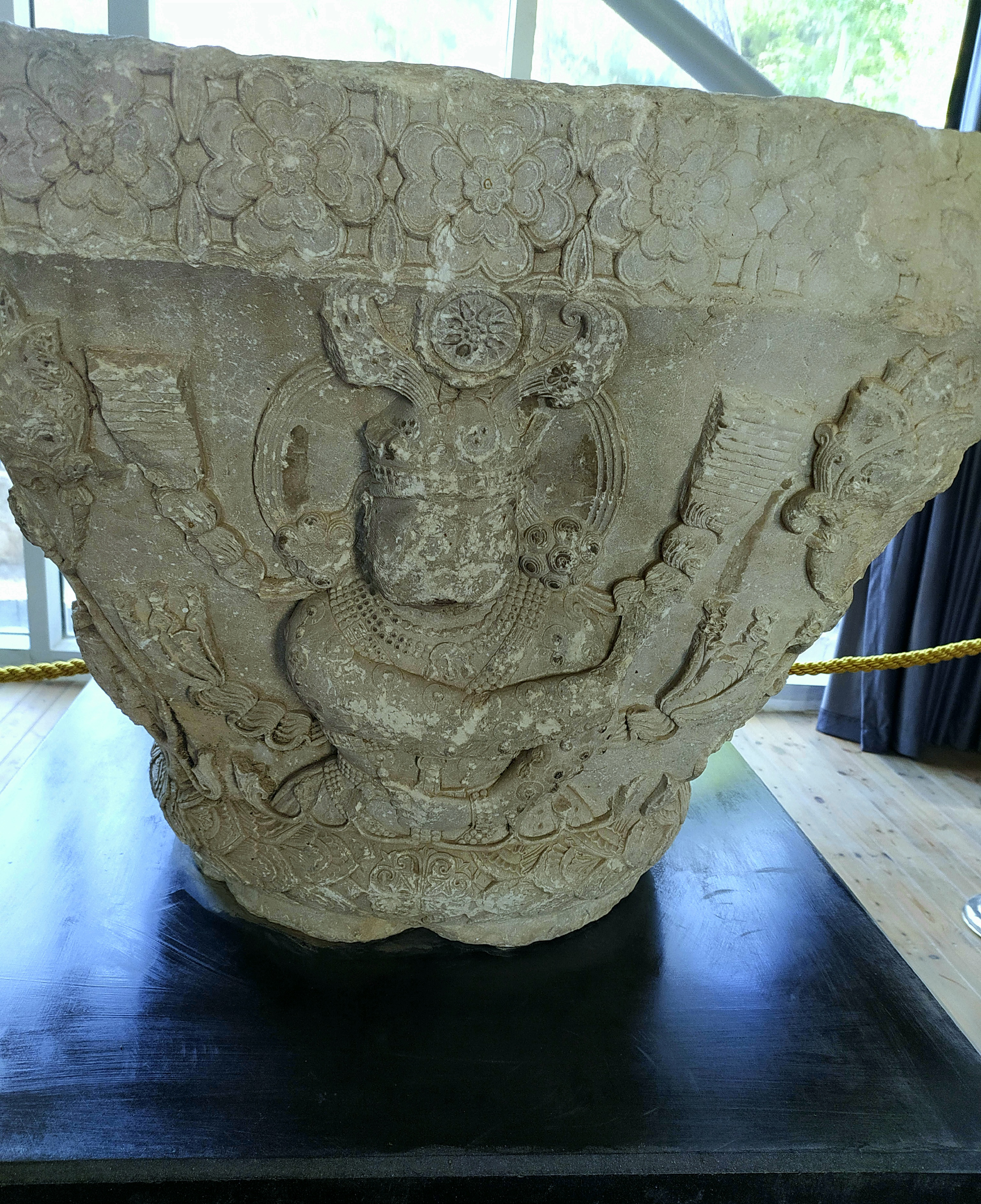
Capital with depiction of Khosrow II at Taq-e Bostan

The battles between Heraclius and Khosrow are depicted in a famous early Renaissance fresco by Piero della Francesca, part of the History of the True Cross cycle in the church of San Francesco, Arezzo. Many Persian miniature paintings depict events in his life, like his battles or his assassination.

== Family ==
Khosrow was the son of Hormizd IV and an unnamed Ispahbudhan noblewoman, the sister of Vistahm and Vinduyih. Khosrow also had two cousins from the Ispahbudhan family, named Mah-Adhur Gushnasp and Narsi. He had a brother-in-law named Hormuzan, a Sasanian nobleman from one of the seven Parthian clans, who later fought against the Arabs during the Muslim invasion of Persia.

Of Khosrow's wives, the Christian Shirin played the most prominent public role. She bore Khosrow a son, Mardanshah, and unsuccessfully tried to secure his succession. Another one of Khosrow's wives was Maria, which some sources depict as the daughter of the Byzantine emperor Maurice. However, this identification is generally not accepted by scholars. Maria may have been a Greek girl in Khosrow's harem, later remembered as a Byzantine princess. Maria was the mother of Khosrow's successor Kavad II. The 9th-century historian Dinawari claims that Khosrow married Gordiya, the sister of Bahram Chobin, after the latter's death, and that Gordiya bore him a son named Javanshir. Javanshir is supposed to have ruled before Khosrow's daughter Borandukht, but he is not represented in Sasanian coinage. Khosrow also had other children: daughters Borandukht and Azarmidokht and sons Shahriyar and Farrukhzad Khosrow V. All these persons, except Shahriyar, would later become monarchs of Iran during the Sasanian civil war of 628–632. Khosrow had a sister who was married to the Sasanian spahbed Shahrbaraz and bore him Shapur-i Shahrvaraz. She was called Mihran because she had married into the House of Mihran.

=== Family tree ===
Khosrow I (531–579)	Shapur († 580s)
Hormizd IV (579–590)	Unknown	Vistahm (590/1–596 or 594/5–600)	Vinduyih	Unnamed noblewoman	Jushnas
Khosrow II (590–628)	Kavad	Mihran	Mah-Adhur Gushnasp	Narsi
Kavad II (628)	Azarmidokht (630–631)	Mardanshah († 628)	Javanshir	Khosrow III (630)	Shapur-i Shahrvaraz (630)	Anoshagan	Bistam
Borandukht (629–630, 631–632)	Farrukhzad Khosrow V (631)	Shahriyar († 628)	Unknown	Kavad Gushnasp	Tamahij
Yazdegerd III (632 - † 651)

== See also ==
- Babai the Great
- Behistun Inscription
- Behistun Palace
- Kisra legend, an African migration myth that historian Leo Frobenius argued was based on Khosrow II
- Muqawqis, Ruler of Alexandria
- Non-Muslim interactants with Muslims during Muhammad's era
- Shabdiz, Khosrow's highly admired horse
- Ganj-e Badavard

== Sources ==
- al-Mubarakpuri, Saif-ur-Rahman (2002). al-Raheeq al-Makhtoom, "The Sealed Nectar". Islamic University of Medina. Riyadh: Darussalam publishers. ISBN 1-59144-071-8.
- Al-Tabari, Abu Ja'far Muhammad ibn Jarir (1985–2007). Ehsan Yar-Shater (ed.). The History of Al-Ṭabarī. Albany, NY: State University of New York Press. 40 vols.
- Baca-Winters, Keenan. He Did Not Fear: Xusro Parviz, King of Kings of the Sasanian Empire. Gorgias Press, 2019. ISBN 978-1-4632-3927-5
- Baca-Winters, Keenan. "From Rome to Iran: Identity and Xusro II." PhD. diss., University of California, Irvine, 2015. https://escholarship.org/uc/item/1rp8c11b
- Börm, Henning (30 April 2020). "Chosroes II, Parvēz, Sasanian king, 590–628 CE". Oxford Research Encyclopedia of Classics. Oxford University Press. doi:10.1093/acrefore/9780199381135.013.8146. ISBN 978-0-19-938113-5.
- Canepa, Matthew P. (2018). The Iranian Expanse: Transforming Royal Identity through Architecture, Landscape, and the Built Environment, 550 BCE–642 CE. University of California Press. ISBN 978-0520964365.
- Crawford, Peter (2013). The War of the Three Gods: Romans, Persians and the Rise of Islam. Pen and Sword. ISBN 978-1-84884-612-8.
- Daryaee, Touraj (2014). Sasanian Persia: The Rise and Fall of an Empire. I.B. Tauris. pp. 1–240. ISBN 978-0857716668.
- Daryaee, Touraj; Rezakhani, Khodadad (2016). From Oxus to Euphrates: The World of Late Antique Iran. H&S Media. ISBN 978-1780835778.
- Edward Walford, translator, The Ecclesiastical History of Evagrius: A History of the Church from AD 431 to AD 594, 1846. Reprinted 2008. Evolution Publishing, ISBN 978-1-889758-88-6. – a primary source containing detailed information about the early reign of Khosrow II and his relationship with the Romans.
- Foss, Clive (1975). "The Persians in Asia Minor and the End of Antiquity". The English Historical Review. 90. Oxford University Press: 721–747. doi:10.1093/ehr/XC.CCCLVII.721.
- Frye, R. N. (1983). "Chapter 4: The political history of Iran under the Sasanians". The Cambridge History of Iran. Volume 3 Part 1. The Seleucid, Parthian and Sasanid Periods. Cambridge University Press. ISBN 978-0-521-20092-9.
- Frye, R. N. (1984). "The reforms of Chosroes Anushirvan ('Of the Immortal soul')". The History of Ancient Iran – via fordham.edu/.
- Garsoïan, Nina (2000) [First published 1983]. "Byzantium and the Sasanians". The Cambridge History of Iran. Volume 3 Part 1. The Seleucid, Parthian and Sasanid Periods. Cambridge University Press. ISBN 978-0-521-20092-9.
- Greatrex, Geoffrey; Lieu, Samuel N. C. (2005). The Roman Eastern Frontier and the Persian Wars AD 363–628. Routledge. ISBN 978-1-134-75646-9.
- Greatrex, Geoffrey; Lieu, Samuel N. C. (2002). The Roman Eastern Frontier and the Persian Wars (Part II, 363–630 AD). New York and London: Routledge (Taylor & Francis). ISBN 0-415-14687-9.
- Hansman, J. F. (1986). "Arbela". Encyclopaedia Iranica, Vol. II, Fasc. 3. pp. 277–278.
- Howard-Johnston, James (2006). East Rome, Sasanian Persia And the End of Antiquity: Historiographical And Historical Studies. Ashgate Publishing. ISBN 0-86078-992-6.
- Howard-Johnston, James (2010). "Ḵosrow II". Encyclopaedia Iranica, Online Edition.
- Kia, Mehrdad (2016). he Persian Empire: A Historical Encyclopedia [2 volumes]: A Historical Encyclopedia. ABC-CLIO. ISBN 978-1-61069-391-2.
- Landau-Tasseron, Ella (15 December 1996). "Ḏū Qār". Encyclopædia Iranica.
- Martindale, John Robert; Jones, Arnold Hugh Martin; Morris, J., eds. (1992). The Prosopography of the Later Roman Empire, Volume III: A.D. 527–641. Cambridge: Cambridge University Press. ISBN 978-0-521-20160-5.
- Meyer, Eduard (1911). "Chosroes s.v. Chosroes II" . In Chisholm, Hugh (ed.). Encyclopædia Britannica. Vol. 6 (11th ed.). Cambridge University Press. p. 272.
- Morony, M. (1980). "Kisra". In C.E. Bosworth; E. van Donzel; B. Lewis; C. Pellat (eds.). The Encyclopaedia of Islam, Vol. V. E.J.Brill. ISBN 9004060561.
- Morony, Michael G. (2005). Iraq After the Muslim Conquest. Piscataway, New Jersey: Gorgias Press. ISBN 978-15-93333-15-7.
- Mubarakpuri, Safiur-Rahman (2009). When The Moon Split. Darussalam. ISBN 978-603-500-060-4.
- Nicholson, Oliver; Canepa, Matthew; Daryaee, Touraj (2018). "Khosrow I Anoshirvan". In Nicholson, Oliver (ed.). The Oxford Dictionary of Late Antiquity. Oxford: Oxford University Press. ISBN 978-0-19-866277-8.
- Oman, Charles (1893). Europe, 476–918, Volume 1. Macmillan.
- Payne, Richard E. (2015). A State of Mixture: Christians, Zoroastrians, and Iranian Political Culture in Late Antiquity. Univ of California Press. ISBN 978-0520961531.
- Pourshariati, Parvaneh (2008). Decline and Fall of the Sasanian Empire: The Sasanian-Parthian Confederacy and the Arab Conquest of Iran. London and New York: I.B. Tauris. ISBN 978-1-84511-645-3.
- Kaegi, Walter Emil (2003). Heraclius: Emperor of Byzantium. Cambridge, United Kingdom: Cambridge University Press. ISBN 0-521-81459-6.
- Rapp, Stephen H. Jr (2014). The Sasanian World through Georgian Eyes: Caucasia and the Iranian Commonwealth in Late Antique Georgian Literature. Routledge. ISBN 978-1472425522.
- Rawlinson, George (2004). The Seven Great Monarchies of the Ancient Eastern World. Gorgias Press. ISBN 978-1593331719.
- Rezakhani, Khodadad (2017). "East Iran in Late Antiquity". ReOrienting the Sasanians: East Iran in Late Antiquity. Edinburgh University Press. ISBN 978-1474400305. JSTOR 10.3366/j.ctt1g04zr8.
- Schindel, Nikolaus (2013). "Sasanian Coinage". In Potts, Daniel T. (ed.). The Oxford Handbook of Ancient Iran. Oxford University Press. ISBN 978-0199733309.
- Schmitt, R.; Bailey, H. W. (1986). "Armenia and Iran iv. Iranian influences in Armenian Language". Encyclopaedia Iranica, Vol. II, Fasc. 4–5. pp. 445–465.
- Shahbazi, A. Shapur (1988). "Bahram VI Cobin". Encyclopaedia Iranica, Vol. III, Fasc. 5. London et al.: Encyclopaedia Iranica. pp. 514–522.
- Shahbazi, A. Shapur (2004). "Hormozd IV". Encyclopaedia Iranica, Vol. XII, Fasc. 5. pp. 466–467.
- Shahbazi, A. Shapur (15 December 2004b). "Hormozān". Encyclopaedia Iranica.
- Shahbazi, A. (2005). "Sasanian dynasty". Encyclopaedia Iranica, Online Edition.
- Shahbazi, A. (1989). "Bestām O Bendôy". Encyclopaedia Iranica, Vol. IV, Fasc. 2. pp. 180–182. Archived from the original on 22 September 2013.
- Shayegan, M. Rahim (2013). "Sasanian political ideology". In Potts, Daniel T. (ed.). The Oxford Handbook of Ancient Iran. Oxford University Press. ISBN 978-0190668662.
- Skjærvø, Prods Oktor (2000). "Kayāniān vii. Kauui Haosrauuah, Kay Husrōy, Kay Ḵosrow". Encyclopaedia Iranica.
- Soudavar, Abolala (January 2012). "Looking through The Two Eyes of the Earth: A Reassessment of Sasanian Rock Reliefs" (PDF). Iranian Studies. 45 (1): 29–58. doi:10.1080/00210862.2011.595976. S2CID 154699256 – via www.soudavar.com.
- Tafazzoli, A. (1987). "Asfād Jošnas". Encyclopaedia Iranica, Vol. II, Fasc. 7.

Khosrow II Sasanian dynasty Born: c. 570 Died: February 628
Preceded by Hormizd IV	King of Kings of Iran and non-Iran; 590	Succeeded by Bahram Chobin
Preceded by Bahram Chobin	King of Kings of Iran and non-Iran; 591–628	Succeeded by Kavad II
