= Shirin =

Wife of Khosrau II

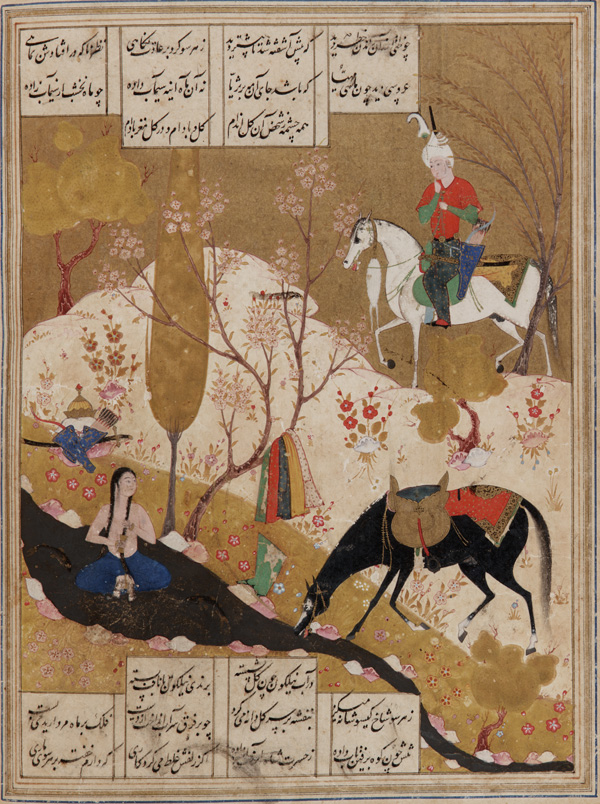
- Khosrow Parviz's first sight of Shirin, bathing in a pool, in a manuscript of Nizami Ganjavi's poem. This is a famous moment in Persian literature.
- Died: 628
- Spouse: Khosrow II
- Issue: Mardanshah; Shahriyar
- Religion: Church of the East, then Syriac Orthodox Church

Shirin (Persian: شیرین; died 628) was the wife of the Sasanian emperor Khosrow II (r. 590–628). In the revolution after the death of Khosrow's father Hormizd IV, the General Bahram Chobin took power over the Persian empire. Shirin fled with Khosrow to Syria, where they lived under the protection of Byzantine emperor Maurice.

In 591, Khosrow returned to Persia to take control of the empire and Shirin was made queen. She used her new influence to support the Christian minority in Iran, but the political situation demanded that she do so discreetly. Initially, she belonged to the Church of the East but later she joined the miaphysite church of Antioch, now known as the Syriac Orthodox Church, under the influence of her physician, Gabriel of Sinjar, who cured her of her sterility. After the Sasanian conquest of Jerusalem in 614 amidst the Byzantine–Sasanian War of 602–628, the Sasanians captured the True Cross of Jesus and brought it to their capital Ctesiphon, where Shirin took the cross in her palace.

Long after her death Shirin became an important heroine of Persian literature, as a model of a faithful lover and wife. She appears in the Shahnameh and the romance epic poem Khosrow and Shirin by Nizami Ganjavi (1141−1209), and is referred to in a variety of other works. Her elaborated story in literature bears little or no resemblance to the fairly few known historical facts of her life, although her Christianity and difficulties after the assassination of her husband remain part of the story, as well as Khosrow's exile before he regained his throne. After their first accidental meeting, when Khosrow was initially unaware of her identity, their courtship takes a number of twists and turns, with the pair often apart, that occupy most of the story. After Khosrow's son kills him, the son demands that Shirin marry him, which she avoids by committing suicide.

== Early Life ==
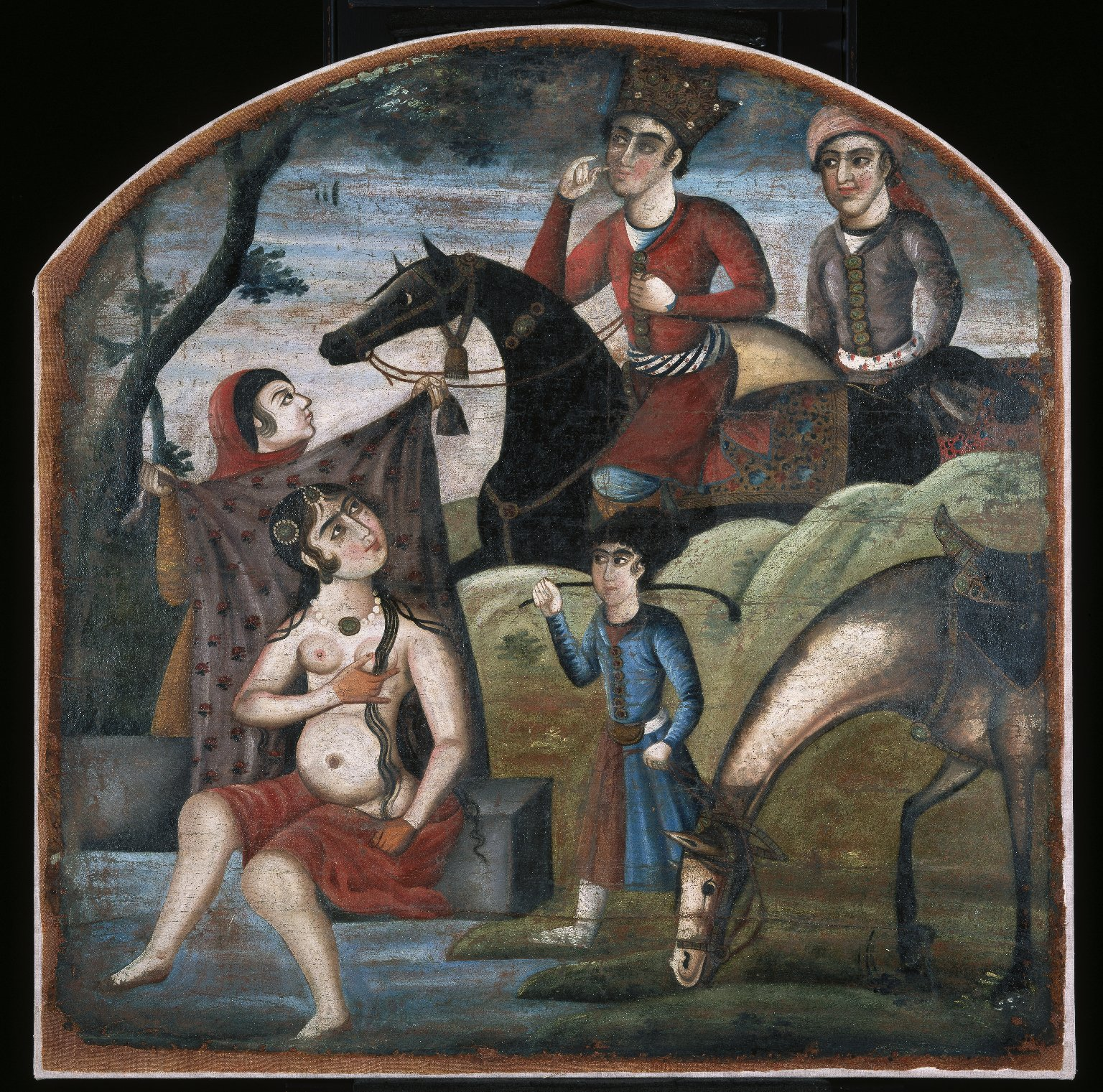
Khusraw Discovers Shirin Bathing, From Pictorial Cycle of Eight Poetic Subjects, mid 18th century. Brooklyn Museum

The background of Shirin is uncertain, although she was most likely of Iranian ethnicity. According to the 7th-century Armenian historian Sebeos (died after 661), she was a native of Khuzistan in southwestern Iran. However, two Syriac chronicles state that she was "Aramean", i.e., from the region of Assyria. The Persian historian Mirkhvand (died 1498), writing much later, states that she used to be a servant in a Persian house which Khosrow II used to regularly visit during his teens. The 11th-century Persian epic Shahnameh ("The Book of Kings") by Ferdowsi (died 1019/1025), which was based on the Middle Persian text Khwaday-Namag ("Book of Lords"), states that Shirin was already married to Khosrow II by the time he fled to the Byzantine Empire. None of these accounts are substantiated by earlier sources, which may indicate that they were later established legends. The early 7th-century Byzantine historian Theophylact Simocatta does not mention the names of the two women who fled with Khosrow II.

The tradition identifying Shirin as Armenian is false, and appears to be of later origin. She is later identified as a Seljuk Turk.

== Marriage ==
The earliest source mentioning Shirin is the Ecclesiastical history of Evagrius Scholasticus, where she is mentioned as "Sira". It preserves a letter sent by Khosrau II to the shrine of Saint Sergius in Resafa. One dated to 592/593 includes the following passage:

"At the time when I [Khosrau II] was at Beramais, I begged of thee, O holy one, that thou wouldest come to my aid, and that Sira might conceive: and inasmuch as Sira was a Christian and I a heathen, and our law forbids us to have a Christian wife, nevertheless, on account of my favourable feelings towards thee, I disregarded the law as respects her, and among my wives I have constantly esteemed, and do still esteem her as peculiarly mine."

"Thus I resolved to request of thy goodness, O Saint, that she might conceive: and I made the request with a vow, that, if Sira should conceive, I would send the cross she wears to thy venerable sanctuary. On this account both I and Sira purposed to retain this cross in memory of thy name, O Saint, and in place of it to send five thousand staters, as its value, which does not really exceed four thousand four hundred staters. From the time that I conceived this request and these intentions, until I reached Rhosochosron, not more than ten days elapsed, when thou, O Saint, not on account of my worthiness but thy kindness, appearedst to me in a vision of the night and didst thrice tell me that Sira should conceive, while, in the same vision, thrice I replied, It is well."

"From that day forward Sira has not experienced the custom of women, because thou art the granter of requests; though I, had I not believed thy words, and that thou art holy and the granter of requests, should have doubted that she would not thenceforward experience the custom of women. From this circumstance I was convinced of the power of the vision and the truth of thy words, and accordingly forthwith sent the same cross and its value to thy venerable sanctuary, with directions that out of that sum should be made a disc, and a cup for the purposes of the divine mysteries, as also a cross to be fixed upon the holy table, and a censer, all of gold: also a Hunnish veil adorned with gold. Let the surplus of the sum belong to thy sanctuary, in order that by virtue of thy fortune, O saint, thou mayest come to the aid of me and Sira in all matters, and especially with respect to this petition; and that what has been already procured for us by thy intercession, may be consummated according to the compassion of thy goodness, and the desire of me and Sira; so that both of us, and all persons in the world, may trust in thy power and continue to believe in thee."

Theophylact Simocatta gives a similar account with additional information. "In the following year the Persian king [Khosrau II] proclaimed as queen Seirem [Shirin] who was of Roman birth and Christian religion, and of an age blossoming for marriage, slept with her. ... "In the third year he entreated Sergius, the most efficacious in Persia, that a child by Seirem be granted to him. Shortly afterwards this came to pass for him.

The Roman (Byzantine) ancestry of Shirin is contradicted by the author Sebeos: "[Xosrov], in accordance with their Magian religion, had numerous wives. He also took Christian wives, and had an extremely beautiful Christian wife from the land of Xuzhastan named Shirin, the Bambish, queen of queens [tiknats' tikin]. She constructed a monastery and a church close to the royal abode, and settled priests and deacons there allotting from the court stipends and money for clothing. She lavished gold and silver [on the monastery]. Bravely, with her head held high she preached the gospel of the Kingdom, at court, and none of the grandee mages dared open his mouth to say anything—large or small—about Christians. When, however, days passed and her end approached, many of the mages who had converted to Christianity, were martyred in various places."

The Khuzistan Chronicle, written by an Assyrian Christian from Khuzestan [Iran] probably in 680 is described as the Syriac counterpart of the Armenian work of Sebeos. We read about the relationship between the Catholicos Isho Yahb II and the persian king Khosrau II. Parvez (590-628) : "Isho Yahb was treated respectfully throughout his life, by the king himself and his two christian wives Shirin the Aramean and Mary the Roman". (Theodor. Nöldeke: Die von Guidi herausgegebene syrische Chronik, Wien 1893, p. 10)

The Chronicle of Séert (Siirt) is an anonymously authored historiographical text written by the Church of the East in Persia and the Middle East, possibly as early as the 9th century AD. The text deals with ecclesiastical, social, and political issues of the Christian church giving a history of its leaders and notable members. LVIII. - History of Khosrau Parvez, son of Hormizd "Khosrau, by gratitude for Maurice, ordered to rebuild churches and to honor the Christians. He built himself two churches for Marie (Maryam) and a large church and a castle in the country of Beth Lashpar for his wife Shirin, the Aramean." (Patrologia Orientalis, Tome VII. - Fascicule 2, Histoire Nestorienne (Chronique de Séert), Seconde Partie (1), publiée et traduite par Mgr Addai Scher, Paris 1911, Published Paris : Firmin-Didot 1950 p. 467.)

Khosrow created several cities named after his lover Shirin, including the modern city Qasr-e Shirin, which means palace of Shirin.

== See also ==
- Behistun Palace
- Khosrow and Shirin
- Dalal Khario, author who published a memoir under the pseudonym "Shirin"
- Nizami Ganjavi
- Sasanian music
- List of Iranian women royalty

== Sources ==
- Baum, Wilhelm (2004). Shirin: Christian Queen Myth of Love: A Woman Of Late Antiquity: Historical Reality And Literary Effect. Gorgias Press. ISBN 978-1-59333-282-2.
- Brosius, Maria (2000). "Women i. In Pre-Islamic Persia". Encyclopædia Iranica, online edition. New York: Brill.
- Orsatti, Paola (2006). "Ḵosrow o Širin". Encyclopædia Iranica, online edition. New York: Brill.
- Payne, Richard E. (2015). A State of Mixture: Christians, Zoroastrians, and Iranian Political Culture in Late Antiquity. Univ of California Press. ISBN 978-0-520-29245-1.
- Winkler, Dietmar W. (2003). "The "Apostolic Church of The East": A Brief Introduction to the Writing of Church History and to Terminology". In Wilhelm Baum; Dietmar W. Winkler (eds.). The Church of the East: A Concise History. Routledge. pp. 1–5.
