= Ganj-e Badavard =

Legendary lost treasure

Ganj-e Badavard (New Persian: گنچ باداورد Ganǰ-i Bādāward, literally "the treasure brought by the wind") was the name of one of the legendary eight treasures of the Sasanian king Khosrow II (r. 591-628) according to the majority of Persian sources. According to legend, a Byzantine fleet of 100 (some sources say 1,000) ships was transporting the treasure, including gold, silver, coins and jewels as well as the Holy Cross that was bound for Ethiopia or another destination. After being caught in a storm, the ships were blown off course and taken by the Persians. According to the Shahnameh, however, it was also the treasure of the legendary Kayanid king Kay Khosrow.

== Sources ==
- Omidsalar, Mahmoud (2000). "Ganj-e Bādāvard". Encyclopaedia Iranica, Vol. X, Fasc. 3. pp. 280–281.
