= Şəhriyar, Sabirabad =

Şəhriyar
- Municipality
- Location within Azerbaijan
- Coordinates: 39°56′46″N 48°42′54″E
- Country: Azerbaijan
- Rayon: Sabirabad

Population
  - Total: 2,526
- Time zone: UTC+4 (AZT)
  - Summer (DST): UTC+5 (AZT)

Şəhriyar (until 2004, Aleksandrovka and Aleksandrovskoe) is a village and municipality in the Sabirabad Rayon of Azerbaijan. It has a population of 2,526.
