= Shagriar =

Shagriar may refer to:

- Nalbandyan, Armenia, formerly Mets Shagriar ("Big Shagriar")
- Pokr Shagriar, Armenia, ("Little Shagriar")
