= Şəhriyar, Goygol =

Şəhriyar Վարդաշեն • Vardashen
- Location within Azerbaijan
- Coordinates: 40°31′39″N 46°12′11″E
- Country: Azerbaijan
- District: Goygol

Population
  - Total: 1,114
- Time zone: UTC+4 (AZT)

Şəhriyar (Shahriyar; Armenian: Վարդաշեն, romanized: Vardashen; Armenian: Միրզիկ, romanized: Mirzik, official name until 1999) is a village and municipality in the Goygol District of Azerbaijan. The village had an Armenian population before the exodus of Armenians from Azerbaijan after the outbreak of the Nagorno-Karabakh conflict.

== Demographics ==
It has a population of 1,114..
