= Pokr Shagriar =

Village in Armavir, Armenia

- Location within Armenia
- Coordinates: 40°04′21″N 44°00′30″E
- Country: Armenia
- Marz (Province): Armavir
- Time zone: UTC+4 ( )
  - Summer (DST): UTC+5 ( )

Pokr Shagriar (also, Malyy Shagriar) is a village in the Armavir Province of Armenia.

== See also ==
- Armavir Province
