= Shahriar Manzoor =

Bangladeshi computer scientist

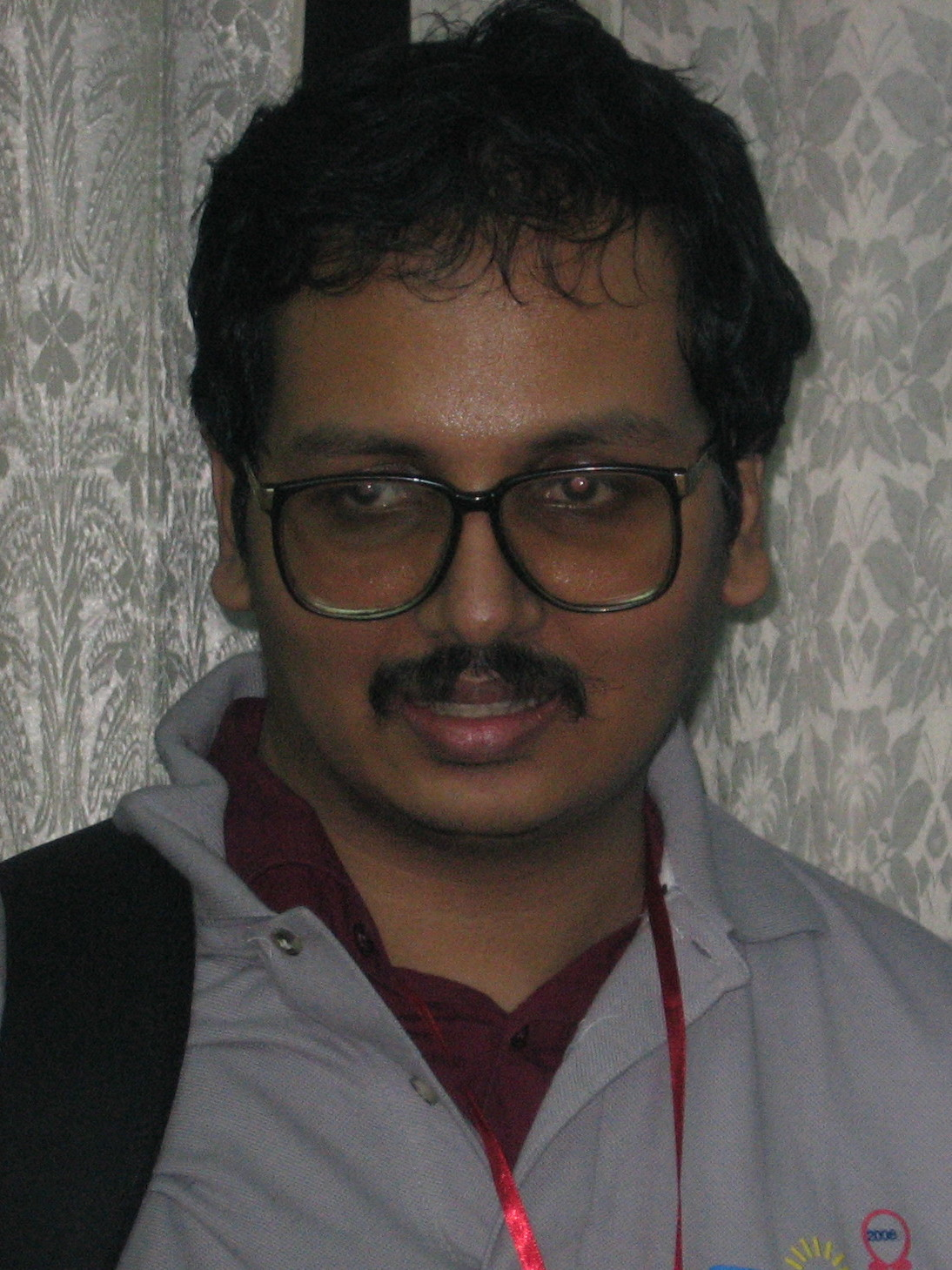
- Born: May 12, 1976; Chittagong, Bangladesh
- Education: Bangladesh University of Engineering and Technology
- Occupations: Problemsetting and teaching
- Known for: Judge of ACM-ICPC World Finals. Chairman Dept. of CSE, Southeast University

Shahriar Manzoor (Bengali: শাহরিয়ার মঞ্জুর) is a Bangladeshi competitive programmer and computer scientist. He is currently the chairman of the Computer Science and Engineering Department of Southeast University. He is a prominent problemsetter of UVa Online Judge. He is a judge of ACM-ICPC World Finals 2003–2018 and chief judge of National Programming Contest 2003 & 2004. He is also the judging director of ACM ICPC Dhaka Site 2004–2018 and chief judge of ACM ICPC Kuala lumpur Regional Contest 2010.

He took part in the ACM ICPC Dhaka Site in the year 1999 as a part of a team from BUET and his team stood third. He started the concept of arranging monthly contests in online judges. He has set around 400 problems in different online, national and international contests like ACM ICPC Asia Regional Contest in Bangladesh, Thailand, Malaysia and China.

== Birth and Education ==
Shahriar Manzoor was born in 1976. His father, ASM Manzoor, was a prominent engineer. His mother, Quazi Quamrun Nahar, was an academician.

Manzoor graduated from Bangladesh University of Engineering (BUET) with a bachelor's degree in Computer Science and Engineering.
