= Shahriyar (son of Khosrow II) =

Sasanian prince

Shahriyar (also spelled Shahryar) was a Sasanian prince—he was the son of Khosrow II (r. 590-628) and his Christian queen Maria or Maryam. In 628, a son of Khosrow II, Kavadh II, staged a coup d'état against his father, and thereafter had all his brothers and half-brothers executed. Shahriyar was survived by his son Yazdegerd III, who would later rule the Sasanian Empire from 632 to 651.

Shahriyar was the son of Khosrow II and his Byzantine wife, Maria (also known as Mariam or Maryam). While contemporary Byzantine sources do not explicitly record this marriage, Eastern historical and literary traditions—including the 9th-century historian al-Tabari and the Persian epic Shahnameh—consistently identify Maria as the daughter of the Byzantine Emperor Maurice and the mother of Khosrow's eldest sons, including Shahriyar. This lineage established a genealogical link between the Byzantine imperial house and Shahriyar's son, Yazdegerd III, a descendant of both the Sasanian and Byzantine imperial houses.

== Sources ==
- Greatrex, Geoffrey; Lieu, Samuel N. C. (2002). The Roman Eastern Frontier and the Persian Wars (Part II, 363–630 AD). New York, New York and London, United Kingdom: Routledge (Taylor & Francis). ISBN 0-415-14687-9.
- Howard-Johnston, James (2010). "ḴOSROW II". Encyclopaedia Iranica, Online Edition.
