= ACM ICPC Dhaka Site =

Annual university computing competition

Data
Established	1997
Region	Asia
Abbreviation	ACM ICPC

ACM International Collegiate Programming Contest (abbreviated as ACM-ICPC or just ICPC) is an annual multi-tiered competition among the universities of the world. There are eighteen different sites in Asia that host Asia Regional Final and Dhaka is one of them. Each year the winner of the Asia Regional Final Dhaka Site Contest advances to the ACM-ICPC World Finals. Like other sites of ICPC, Dhaka site contest is also sponsored by IBM and operated under the auspices of the Association for Computing Machinery (ACM).

== History ==
BUET Bengal Tiger, first champion, ACM ICPC Dhaka site contest and also the first team from Bangladesh to participate in the ACM ICPC World Final.

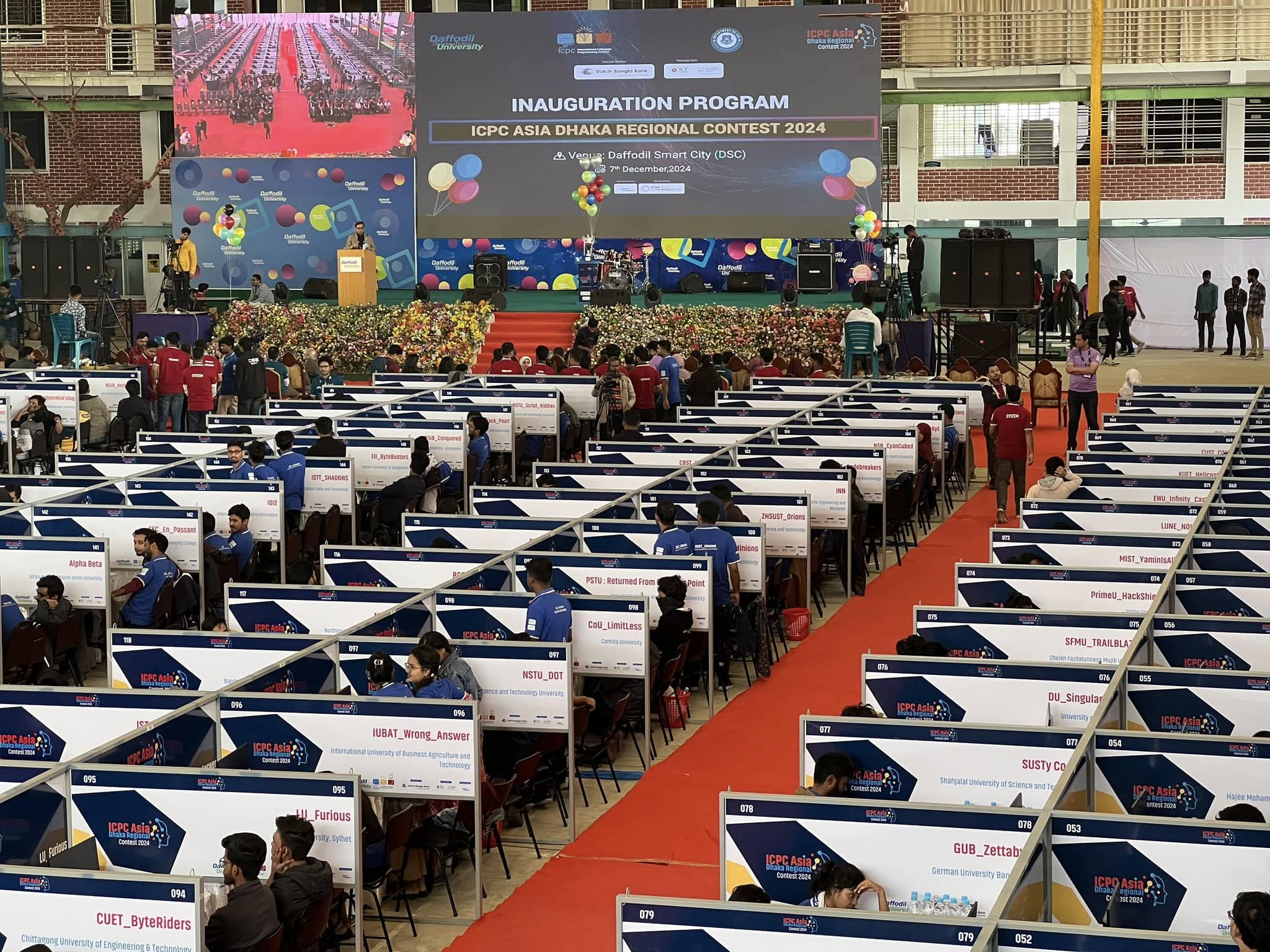
DIU hosted the biggest onsite programming contest in ICPC Dhaka Regional 2024.

ACM ICPC Dhaka site contest started in 1997 with the initiative of Professor A. L. Haque of North South University (NSU). Its first event was held on 18 November 1997 with the participation of 18 teams from 11 institutions. Bangladesh University of Engineering and Technology - BUET Bengal Tigers team became the champion and moved to the world final which was held on 28 February 1998 at Atlanta, Georgia, United States. Champion BUET team of Suman Kumar Nath (now at Microsoft Research), Rezaul Alam Chowdhury (UT Austin) and Tarique Mesbaul Islam (Waterloo) occupied 24th position in the world final among 54 teams tying with Stanford University. Same year, NSU team received a wild card for being the host of the Dhaka site regional contest and participated in the world final.

North South University hosted this event 12 times from 1997 to 1999, 2004 to 2006, 2008 to 2011, 2013 and 2015 while Bangladesh University of Engineering and Technology hosted thrice from 2001 to 2003. East West University hosted the event in 2007. Daffodil International University hosted the event in 2012, 2018 and 2024. Bangladesh University of Business and Technology hosted the event in 2014 and 2021. Green University of Bangladesh hosted the event in 2022 which was held on 10–11 March 2023 at its permanent campus.

== Past events ==
=== 1997 ===
- Champion: Bangladesh University of Engineering and Technology
- Host: North South University
- Champion's position at the world final: 24th
- Notes: Bangladesh University of Engineering and Technology also secured 2nd, 3rd and 4th place.

=== 1998 ===
- Champion: Bangladesh University of Engineering and Technology
- Host: North South University
- Champion's position at the world final: Honorable Mention
- Notes: Bangladesh University of Engineering and Technology also secured 3rd and 4th place. Sharif University of Tehran and IIT Kanpur secured 7th and 11th place respectively.

=== 1999 ===
- Champion: Chinese University of Hong Kong
- Host: North South University
- Champion's position at the world final: 8th
- Notes: Bangladesh University of Engineering and Technology secured 2nd, 3rd and 4th place.

=== 2000 ===
- Not Hosted

=== 2001 ===
- Champion: Bangladesh University of Engineering and Technology
- Host: Bangladesh University of Engineering and Technology
- Champion's position at the world final: Honorable Mention
- Notes: Bangladesh University of Engineering and Technology and American International University-Bangladesh secured 2nd place respectively.

=== 2002 ===
- Champion: Bangladesh University of Engineering and Technology
- Host: Bangladesh University of Engineering and Technology
- Champion's position at the world final: Honorable Mention
- Notes: Nanyang Technological University of Singapore secured 2nd place.

=== 2003 ===
- Champion: Fudan University
- Maximum problem solved: 6
- Host: Bangladesh University of Engineering and Technology
- Champion's position at the world final: 15th
- Notes:Bangladesh University of Engineering and Technology secured 2nd and 3rd place. Dhaka University became 4th.

=== 2004 ===
- Champion:Fudan University
- Maximum problem solved: 6
- Host:North South University
- Champion's position at the world final: 6th
- Notes: Bangladesh University of Engineering and Technology secured 2nd place. National University of Singapore and IIT Bombay secured 3rd and 6th place respectively.

=== 2005 ===
- Champion:Fudan University
- Maximum problem solved: 6
- Host:North South University
- Champion's position at the world final: 39th
- Notes: Dhaka University and Bangladesh University of Engineering and Technology secured 2nd and 3rd place respectively. American International University - Bangladesh became 4th. Multimedia University of Malaysia received an honorable mention.

=== 2006 ===
- Champion:RSTU
- Host:North South University
- Champion's position at the world final: 26th
- Notes: Bangladesh University of Engineering and Technology secured 2nd place. American International University - Bangladesh and North South University jointly secured 3rd place.

=== 2007 ===
- Champion: Bangladesh University of Engineering and Technology
- Host: East West University
- Maximum problem solved: 7
- Champion's position at the world final: 31st
- Notes: Fudan University and East West University secured 2nd and 3rd place respectively. Total 86 Teams from 33 Universities competed to take the pride to qualify for ACM ICPC world final 2008.

=== 2008 ===
- Champion: Fudan University
- Host: North South University
- Maximum problem solved: 9
- Champion's position at the world final: 14th
- Notes; Bangladesh University of Engineering and Technology secured 2nd place and received wild card for participating in the world finals. A total of 83 teams competed.

=== 2009 ===
- Champion: Fudan University
- Host: North South University
- Maximum problem solved: 7
- Champion's position at the world final: 11th
- Notes; Bangladesh University of Engineering and Technology secured 2nd place and Dhaka University placed 3rd. A total of 89 teams participated.

=== 2010 ===
- Champion: Bangladesh University of Engineering and Technology
- Host: North South University
- Maximum problem solved: 6
- Champion's position at the world final: Honorable Mention
- Notes: Fudan University and Bangladesh University of Engineering and Technology secured 2nd and 3rd place respectively. Total 103 Teams from 43 Universities competed for a spot at the ACM ICPC world final 2011.

=== 2011 ===
- Champion: Bangladesh University of Engineering and Technology
- Host: North South University
- Maximum problem solved: 5
- Champion's position at the world final: Honorable Mention

=== 2012 ===
- Champion: Shanghai Jiao Tong University
- Host: Daffodil International University
- Maximum problem solved: 7
- Champion's position at the world final: 4th

=== 2013 ===
- Champion: Shahjalal University of Science and Technology
- Host: North South University
- Maximum problem solved: 7
- Champion's position at the world final: Honorable Mention

=== 2014 ===
- Champion: Shahjalal University of Science and Technology
- Host: Bangladesh University of Business and Technology
- Maximum problem solved: 7
- Champion's position at the world final: 54

=== 2015 ===
- Champion: Jahangirnagar University
- Host: North South University
- Maximum problem solved: 7
- Champion's position at the world final: 44

=== 2016 ===
- Champion: Bangladesh University of Engineering and Technology
- Host: University of Asia Pacific
- Maximum problem solved: 10
- Champion's position at the world final: Honorable Mention

=== 2017 ===
- Champion: Bangladesh University of Engineering and Technology
- Host: University of Asia Pacific
- Maximum problem solved: 10
- Champion's position at the world final: 56th

=== 2018 ===
- Champion: Shahjalal University of Science and Technology
- Host: Daffodil International University
- Maximum problem solved: 6
- Champion's position at the world final: HM

=== 2019 ===
- Champion: Bangladesh University of Engineering and Technology
- Host: Southeast University
- Maximum problem solved: 8
- Champion's position at the world final: 24th (Asia West Champions)

=== 2021 ===
- Champion: Bangladesh University of Engineering and Technology
- Host: Bangladesh University of Business and Technology
- Maximum problem solved: unknown
- Champion's position at the world final: not held yet

=== 2022 ===
- Champion: The University of Dhaka
- Host: Green University of Bangladesh
- Maximum problem solved: 10
- Champion's position at the world final: not held yet

=== 2024 ===
- Champion: Shahjalal University of Science and Technology
- Host: Daffodil International University
- Maximum problem solved: 7
- Champion's position at the world final: 117

== Dhaka site local teams in the world final ==
Each year at least one local team from Dhaka site takes part in the world final either as the regional champion or by wild card. On few occasions Dhaka site local teams made it by winning ACM ICPC Kanpur site regional. In 2005, Fudan University became champion at two different sites and withdrawn their championship from Dhaka site. As a result, 2nd ranked team, University of Dhaka who was supposed to get a wild card got the direct entry to the world final and Bangladesh University of Engineering and Technology got the wild card. Summary of all the Dhaka site local team results in the world final are illustrated in the following table:

World Final	Date	Place	University	Team name	Contestant	Coach	Result	Entry
22nd	Feb 28, 1998	Atlanta, Georgia	Bangladesh University of Engineering and Technology	Bengal Tigers	Suman Kumar Nath, Rezaul Alam Chowdhury, Tarique Mesbaul Islam		24th	Dhaka site champion
			North South University	NSU Dream	Tarique Zaman Chowdhury, Mehrin Shahed, Salman Ahmed Awan		H.M.	Dhaka site wild card
23rd	April 12, 1999	Eindhoven, Netherlands	Bangladesh University of Engineering and Technology	The Balloon Counters	Rezaul Alam Chowdhury, Mojahedul Hoque Abul Hasanat, Mehedy Masood		H.M.	Dhaka site champion
24th	March 18, 2000	Orlando, Florida	Bangladesh University of Engineering and Technology	BUET Backtrackers	Mustaq Ahmed, Munirul Abedin, M Rubaiyat Ferdous Jewel	Mohammad Kaykobad	11th	Kanpur site champion
25th	March 10, 2001	Vancouver, Canada	Bangladesh University of Engineering and Technology	BUET Loopers	Mustaq Ahmed, Munirul Abedin, Abdullah Al Mahmud	Mohammad Kaykobad	29th	Kanpur site champion
26th	March 23, 2002	Honolulu, Hawaii	Bangladesh University of Engineering and Technology	BUET Ackermanns	Md Kamruzzaman, Abdullah Al Mahmud, Mushfiqur Rouf	Mohammad Kaykobad	H.M	Dhaka site champion
			American International University - Bangladesh	AIUB-A	Adib Hasan Manob, Md. Mahabub Alam, Md. Nurul Amin		H.M.	Dhaka & Kanpur site Runners Up
27th	March 25, 2003	Beverly Hills, California	Bangladesh University of Engineering and Technology	BUET Looping	Asif Haque, Mehedi Bakht, Md Saifur Rahman	Mohammad Kaykobad	H.M	Dhaka site champion
28th	March 31, 2004	Prague, Czech Republic	Bangladesh University of Engineering and Technology	BUET Phoenix	Asif Haque, Mehedi Bakht, Md Saifur Rahman	Mohammad Kaykobad	27th	Dhaka site wild card
29th	April 16, 2005	Shanghai, China	Bangladesh University of Engineering and Technology	BUET Explorer	Mushfiqur Rouf, Abdullah Al Mahmud, Manzurur Rahman Khan		29th	Dhaka site wild card
30th	April 12, 2006	San Antonio, Texas	University of Dhaka	DU Gryffindor	Quazi Sarfaraz Hussain, Ariful Islam Siddiqi, Mainul Islam	Md. Abdur Razzaque	H.M.	Dhaka site direct entry
			Bangladesh University of Engineering and Technology	BUET BUET Exceed	Istiaque Ahmed, Manzurur Khan, Omar Haider		39th	Dhaka site wild card
31st	March 15, 2007	Tokyo, Japan	Bangladesh University of Engineering and Technology	BUET xC33d	Istiaque Ahmed, Sabbir Yousuf Sanny, Mohammad Mahmudur Rahman		H.M.	Dhaka site wild card
32nd	April 9, 2008	Banff, Canada	Bangladesh University of Engineering and Technology	BUET Sprinter	Sabbir Yousuf Sanny, Mahbubul Hasan, Shahriar Rouf		31st	Dhaka site champion
			East West University	EWU Dream of Twilight	Sohel Hafiz, Mahbub Mozadded, Md. Arifuzzaman Arif		H.M.	Dhaka site wild card
33rd	April 21, 2009	Stockholm, Sweden	Bangladesh University of Engineering and Technology	BUET Falcon	Mahbubul Hasan, Shahriar Rouf, Tanaeem M. Moosa		34th	Dhaka site Runner-up
			University of Dhaka	DU Dark Knights	Syed Zubair Hossain, Jane Alam Jan, Iqram Mahmud	Syed Monowar Hossain Rony Hasinur Rahman (Acting Coach)	49th	Kanpur site Runner-up
			North South University	NSU ARCTURUS	Samee Zahur, M. Mustafijur Rahman Faysal, Md. Ameer Hamza	Mohammad Kabir Hossain	H.M.	Kuala Lumpur site
34th	February 5, 2010	Harbin, China	Bangladesh University of Engineering and Technology	BUET Rand Ecliptic	Tanaeem M. Moosa, Tasnim Imran Sunny, Muntasir Mashuq		36th	Dhaka site Runner-up
35th	May 30, 2011	Orlando, Florida	Bangladesh University of Engineering and Technology	BUET Annihilator	Tasnim Imran Sunny, Muntasir Mashuq, Anindya Das		H.M.	Dhaka site Champion
36th	May 18, 2012	Warsaw, Poland	Bangladesh University of Engineering and Technology	BUET .oO	Md. Enzam Hossain, F. A. Rezaur Rahman Chowdhury, Mir Wasi Ahmed	Mohammad Kaykobad	Honorable Mention	Dhaka site Champion
			Shahjalal University of Science and Technology	SUST_PALINDROME	Forhad Ahmed, Baker Mohammad Anas, Md. Maksud Hossain	Shahidul Islam	Honorable Mention	Dhaka site Runners-up
37th	July 3, 2013	Saint Petersburg, Russia	Bangladesh University of Engineering and Technology	Choker	Muhammad Nazmul Hasan, Prasanjit Barua, Mohammad Hafiz Uddin	Mohammad Kaykobad	60th	Dhaka Site Runners-up
			Shahjalal University of Science and Technology	SUST_PALINDROME	Forhad Ahmed, Baker Mohammad Anas, Md. Maksud Hossain	Shahidul Islam	H.M.	
38th	June 25, 2014	Yekaterinburg, Russia	Bangladesh University of Engineering and Technology	[MAX+7]	Prasanjit Barua, Mohammad Hafiz Uddin, Pratyai Mazumder	Mohammad Saifur Rahman	19th	Dhaka Site Runners-up
			Shahjalal University of Science and Technology	SUST_Attoprottoyee	Nafis Ahmed, Syed Shahriar Manjur, Imtiaz Shakil	Debakar Shamanta	Honorable Mention	Dhaka Site Champion
39th	May 20, 2015	Marrakesh, Morocco	Shahjalal University of Science and Technology	SUST_DownToTheWire	Abdullah Al Maruf, Sakibul Mowla, Dhananjoy Biswas	Md. Saiful Islam	51st	Dhaka Site Champion
			Jahangirnagar University	JU_Assassins	Mohammad Nafis Sadique, Aninda Majumder, Suman Bhadra	Mohammad Shorif Uddin	51st	Amritapuri Site Runner-up
40th	May 19, 2016	Phuket, Thailand	Jahangirnagar University	JU_O(N^3)	Md. Nafis Sadique, Raihat Zaman Neloy, Niloy Datta	K M Akkas Ali	44th	Dhaka Site Champion
			Shahjalal University of Science and Technology	SUST_DownToTheWire	Abdullah Al Maruf, Sakibul Mowla, Dhananjoy Biswas	Md. Saiful Islam	Honorable Mention	Dhaka Site Runner-up
			North South University	NSU BugLovers	Mohammad Samiul Islam, Ahmad Faiyaz, Hasib Al Muhaimin	Md Shazzad Hosain	Honorable Mention	Dhaka Site 2nd Runner-up
41st	May 24, 2017	Rapid City, South Dakota	Bangladesh University of Engineering and Technology	BUET Rayo	M M Harun Ur Rashid, Tonmoy Mollik, Nazmur Rashid	Mohammad Kaykobad	H.M.	Dhaka Site Champion
			University of Dhaka	DU_Censored	Shahed Shahriar, Rezwan Mahmud Tonmoy, Sabit Anwar Zahin	Tamal Adhikary	56th	Dhaka Site 2nd Runner-up
			Jahangirnagar University	JU_Circavex	Bir Bahadur Khatri, Raihat Zaman Neloy, Md Sahedul Islam Sohel	Mohammad Shorif Uddin	H.M.	Amritapuri Sub Site Champion
42nd	April 20, 2018	Beijing, China	Bangladesh University of Engineering and Technology	BUET Dracarys	Md Riazul Islam Riaz, Tonmoy Mollik, Nazmur Rashid	Mohammad Kaykobad	56th	Dhaka Site Champion
			Shahjalal University of Science and Technology	SUST_TeamX	Md Kazi Nayeem, Moudud Ahmed Khan Shahriar, Md Nazim Uddin	Md Saiful Islam	56th	Dhaka Site 2nd Runner-up
43rd	April 4, 2019	Porto, Portugal	Bangladesh University of Engineering and Technology	BUET Bloodhound	H.M. Ashiqul Islam, Arghya Pal, Tanveer Muttaqueen	Mohammad Kaykobad	62nd	Dhaka Site 2nd Runner-up
			Shahjalal University of Science and Technology	SUST_Descifrador	Ovishek Paul, Moudud Khan Shahriar, Jubair Aaraf		H.M.	Dhaka Site Champion
44th	October, 2021	Moscow, Russia	Bangladesh University of Engineering and Technology	BUET HellBent	H.M. Ashiqul Islam, Arghya Pal, Pritom Kundu	M Sohel Rahman	24th (Asia West Champions)	Dhaka Site Champion
			University of Dhaka	DU_SwampFire	Jubayer Rahman Nirjhor, Md Shahadat Hossain Shahin, Md Mahamudur Rahaman Sajib		33rd	Asia West Finals 10th place

== ACM ICPC Dhaka site hosts ==
=== Host Universities ===
- 1997 - North South University
- 1998 - North South University
- 1999 - North South University
- 2000 - Not hosted
- 2001 - Bangladesh University of Engineering and Technology
- 2002 - Bangladesh University of Engineering and Technology
- 2003 - Bangladesh University of Engineering and Technology
- 2004 - North South University
- 2005 - North South University
- 2006 - North South University
- 2007 - East West University
- 2008 - North South University
- 2009 - North South University
- 2010 - North South University
- 2011 - North South University
- 2012 - Daffodil International University
- 2013 - North South University
- 2014 - Bangladesh University of Business and Technology
- 2015 - North South University
- 2016 - University of Asia Pacific
- 2017 - University of Asia Pacific
- 2018 - Daffodil International University
- 2019 - Southeast University
- 2020 - University of Dhaka
- 2021 - Bangladesh University of Business and Technology
- 2022 - Green University of Bangladesh
- 2023 - Bangladesh University of Business and Technology
- 2024 - Daffodil International University
- 2025 - Bangladesh University of Business and Technology
- 2026 - International University of Business Agriculture and Technology

== See also ==
- List of computer science awards
