= Şəhriyar, Masally =

Şəhriyar
- Location within Azerbaijan
- Coordinates: 39°06′N 48°45′E
- Country: Azerbaijan
- Rayon: Masally
- Municipality: Əminli
- Time zone: UTC+4 (AZT)
  - Summer (DST): UTC+5 (AZT)

Şəhriyar (also, Shagriyar) is a village in the Masally Rayon of Azerbaijan. The village forms part of the municipality of Əminli.
