= Mardanshah (Sasanian prince) =

Sasanian prince

Mardanshah (Persian: مردانشاه) was a 7th-century Sasanian prince. He was the son of the Sasanian king (shah) Khosrow II (r. 590–628) and his Christian queen Shirin, and was the preferred successor of the Sasanian Empire. He was later killed along with his brothers and half-brothers by his half-brother Kavad II in 628.

== Sources ==
- Pourshariati, Parvaneh (2008). Decline and Fall of the Sasanian Empire: The Sasanian-Parthian Confederacy and the Arab Conquest of Iran. London and New York: I.B. Tauris. ISBN 978-1-84511-645-3.
- Howard-Johnston, James (2010). "Ḵosrow II". Encyclopaedia Iranica, Online Edition.
