= Şəhriyar, Sharur =

Shahriyar
- Municipality
- Azerbaijani: Şəhriyar
- Location within Azerbaijan
- Coordinates: 39°32′53″N 44°56′58″E
- Country: Azerbaijan
- Autonomous republic: Nakhchivan
- District: Sharur

Population (2008)
  - Total: 2,348
- Time zone: UTC+4 (AZT)

Şəhriyar (also, Shahriyar and Shahriar) is a village and municipality in the Sharur District of Nakhchivan, Azerbaijan. It is located 3 km in the west from the district center, on the Sharur plain. Its population is busy with tobacco-growing and animal husbandry. There are secondary school, cultural house, library, mosque and a hospital in the village. It has a population of 2,348.

== Etymology ==
The village was named in Şəhriyar (Shahriyar)in honor of the notable Azerbaijani poet of Məhəmməd Şəhriyar (Mohammad-Hossein Shahriar).
