= Şəhriyar, Ordubad =

Şəhriyar
- Municipality
- Location within Azerbaijan
- Coordinates: 38°55′07″N 46°02′00″E
- Country: Azerbaijan
- Autonomous republic: Nakhchivan
- District: Ordubad

Population
  - Total: 309
- Time zone: UTC+4 (AZT)

Şəhriyar (also, Shahriyar) is a municipality and settlement in the Ordubad District of Nakhchivan, Azerbaijan. Previous name was Ordubad. It was changed to Shahriyar on 1 March 2003. It has a population of 309.

== Etymology ==
In 2003, the settlement was named Shahriyar in honor of the notable Azerbaijani poet Mohammad-Hossein Shahriar.
