= Abu Hasan Shahriar =

Bangladeshi poet

- আবু হাসান শাহরিয়ার
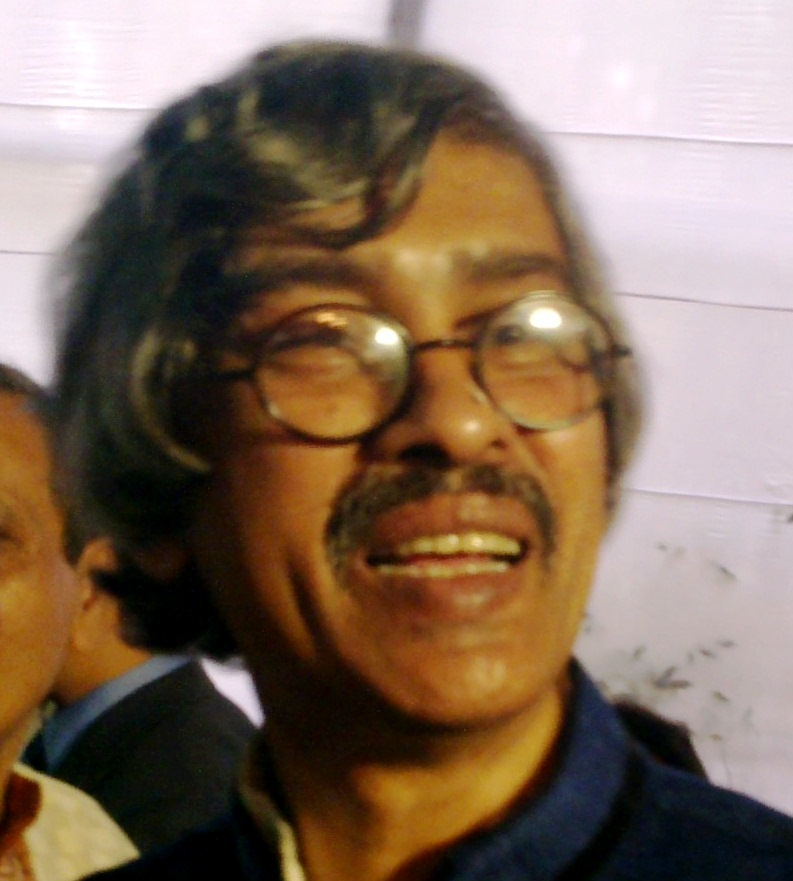
- Photo of poet Abu Hassan Shahrier
- Born: 25 June 1959 (age 66); Sirajganj, Pakistan
- Occupations: poet, novelist
- Spouse: Monira Qais (m. 1983)
- Children: Athoy Nilima
- Parents: Rabeya Siraj; Dr. M Siraj Uddin
- Awards: Bangla Academy Literary Award

Abu Hasan Shahriar (born 25 June 1959) is a Bangladeshi poet. He won 2016 Bangla Academy Literary Award in the category of poetry.

== Works ==
- Antaheen Mayabee Bhomon
- Obyertha Angul
- Tomar Kache Jai Na Tobe Jabo
- Haate Gechhe Jarabastubad
- paaye paaye
- Naihshabder DakGhar
- Tomader Kancher Shahare
