= Shahriar, Fars =

Coordinates: 29°00′N 52°00′E

Shahriar شهريار
- Village
- Interactive map of Shahriar
- Country: Iran
- Province: Fars
- County: Shiraz
- Bakhsh: Zarqan
- Rural District: Zarqan

Population (2006)
  - Total: 2,581
- Time zone: UTC+3:30 (IRST)
  - Summer (DST): UTC+4:30 (IRDT)

Shahriar (Persian: شهريار, also Romanized as Shahrīār) is a village in Zarqan Rural District, Zarqan District, Shiraz County, Fars province, Iran. At the 2006 census, its population was 2,581, in 551 families.
